= Saint Thomas Christian cross =

Ancient cross

Mar Thoma Sleeha (Saint Thomas Cross) or simply Mar Sleeva are ancient crosses associated with the community of Indian subcontinent, who trace their origins to the evangelism of Thomas the Apostle in the 1st century CE. The Saint Thomas Christians, which is one of the oldest Christian communities of the world, survive in the Malabar region in state of Kerala, India and have a diaspora in other parts of the Indian subcontinent. The crosses are also associated with the Knanaya community of Kerala. Saint Thomas Christian crosses are known as Mar Thoma Sleeva (Saint Thomas cross), Indian cross, or Persian Cross in English, as well as Nasrani Sthambam in Malayalam.

Mar Thoma Sleeva are found at Kadamattom, Muttuchira, Kothanalloor, Kottayam, Pallippuram and Alangad in the South Indian state of Kerala. Saint Thomas Christian Crosses have been also found in other parts of the Indian subcontinent, such as Agacaim (Goa), St Thomas Mount (Tamil Nadu), Anuradhapura (Ceylon), Taxila (Pakistan), and in Baltistan. Floriated Indian crosses are found at Kottakkavu, Pallipuram and Niranam. The large open-air rock crosses known as Nasrani Sthambams are found on the facades of many Thomasine Churches. Before the arrival of Portuguese explorers, there were more than 150 Syriac churches in Malabar/Kerala.

== Etymology ==
Mar Thoma Sleeva (also written as Mar Thoma Slīva) is a Syriac-language term which means Saint Thomas cross. Antonio Gouvea states in his 16th-century work Jornada that the old churches of Saint Thomas Christians were full of crosses of the type discovered at S. Thome (Mylapore). He also states that veneration of the cross is an old custom in Malabar. Jornada is the oldest known written document which calls the cross cross from (of) Sam Thome (Mylapore). The original phrase used is Cruz de Sam Thome, meaning "Cross of (from) St. Thomas". For this reason, it can also mean "Cross from Sam Thome", where Mylapore is equivalent to Sam Thomé, the name that the given by the Portuguese to the city of Mylapore. Gouvea also writes about the veneration of the Cross at Cranganore (Kodungallur), mentioning it as Cross of Christians.

== Symbolism ==
Mar Thoma Sleeva or Saint Thomas Cross

Unlike crosses in other traditions, the St Thomas cross does not carry the effigy of the Christ. In addition to this unique quality, each of its elements carry symbolic meanings. Generally the Cross symbolizes life rather than death and suffering.

- Lacking the effigy of Jesus, the St Thomas cross presages the discovery of the empty tomb, glorifying the Resurrection of Jesus.
- The four edges of the cross are floral in shape, symbolizing fruition and life from the tree of life.
- The lotus flower beneath the cross is a symbol of Buddhism and India. A cultural adaptation of local imagery, the cross fixed on the lotus would symbolize Christianity in India in the first century.
- The three steps below the Cross represent Golgotha, symbolically referring to the death of Jesus, also the three decks of the Ark and the ascent to Mt. Sinai.
- Finally, the dove above the cross represents the Holy Spirit, the third person of the Holy Trinity according to the Christian tradition. It is this spirit that raised Jesus from the dead and bestows gifts upon the Church's faithful.

== Locations ==
Mar Thoma Sleeva can be found at the following locations:

The crosses are at the following locations:
Sl. no.	Location	Preserved at	Image	Notes
1	Mylapore, Tamil Nadu	Our Lady of expectations Church, St. Thomas Mount		Under Roman Catholic diocese of Chingelpet.
2	Alangad, Kerala	Saint Mary's Church, Alangad		Under Syro-Malabar Church.
4	Kottayam, Kerala	Saint Mary's Knanaya Valiyapalli	Cross dated to the 10th century (right altar) - Kottayam Knanaya Valiyapally Cross dated to the 10th Century (right altar); cross dated between the 7-8th century (Left Altar) - Kottayam Knanaya Valiyapally	Believed to have originally been exhibited at the churches built by the merchant Knai Thoma in Kodungallur. Later moved to Kaduthuruthy Knanaya Church due to the destruction of the Knanaya settlement of Kodungallur in a battle between the Kingdom of Kozhikode and the Kingdom of Kochi in 1524. Finally moved to St. Mary's Knanaya Church Kottayam at its erection in 1550 CE. The left altar cross was dated between the 7th and 8th century by Assyriologist C.P.T Winkworth in 1928. The right altar cross was dated to the 10th century by Assyriologist C.P.T. Winkworth in 1928.
5	Muttuchira, Kerala	Ruha d' Kudsha Church		Under the Syro-Malabar Catholic Eparchy of Palai.
6	Kadamattam, Kerala	Saint George Church		Under Malankara Orthodox Church.
7	Kothanalloor, Kerala	St Gervasis and Prothasis Church		Under Syro-Malabar Catholic Eparchy of Palai.
8	Agasaim, Goa	Pilar Seminary Museum		
9	Anuradhapura, Sri Lanka	Anuradhapura museum		This cross is considered to be the oldest cross in Sri Lanka. It was found in 1912 during excavations of Anuradhapura.

Other similar crosses:

- Xi'an, China. On the Xi'an Stele (also known as the "Nestorian Stele"), erected in 781, there is a cross rising from a lotus, surrounded by a pair of symmetrical clouds. The lotus consists of seven petals, and two branches with flowers are depicted on either side of the main pattern. At the top of the cross is a glowing flame motif (similar to the dove above the cross in the case of the St. Thomas crosses).

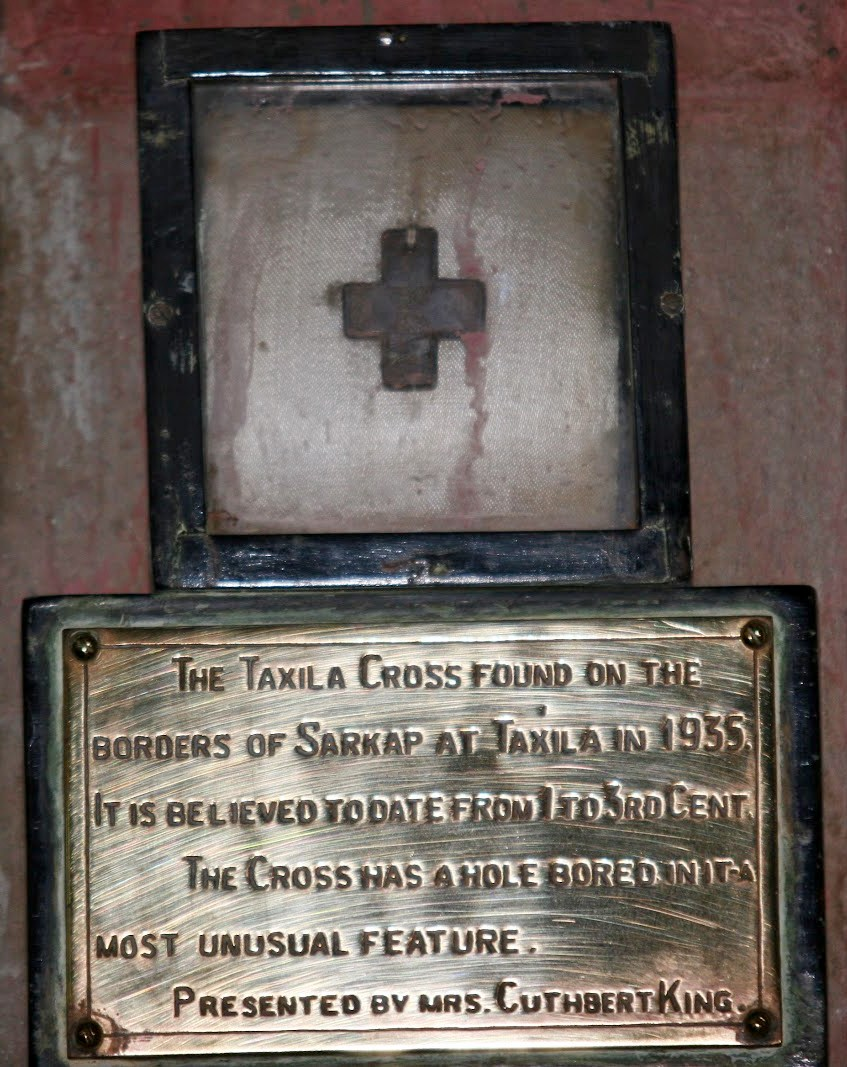
Taxila Cross at Lahore Cathedral

- Taxila, Pakistan. It is a very small cross that found in a field near the ancient city Sirkap near Taxila. The cross is kept at the Cathedral Church of the Resurrection, Lahore. However, experts point out that the cross shares only one characteristic with other St Thomas crosses: mostly equilateral, with arms of equal length. They claim that the Christian antiquity of this cross cannot be conclusively proven, as the same characteristic is also observed in pre-Christian Buddhist crosses and Swastika-variants found in the region, and even in Greek crosses.
- An Indian cross is depicted on the rock-piece at the front of the Parur (North) church, first published in the St Thomas Christian Encyclopaedia of India, Vol.II, 1973, Ed. George Menachery.
- There is a St Thomas cross in stone on the porch of the Church of St Thomas the Apostle, Killinghall, carved by Charles Mawer of Leeds.

=== Interpretation of the inscriptions ===
In 1873, an archaeologist named Arthur Coke translated the inscriptions as follows:

"In punishment by the cross (was) the suffering of this one;
He who is the true christ, and God above and Guide ever pure."

F. C. Burkitt and C. P. T. Winckworth, the then-reader of Assyriology in the University of Cambridge, studied the inscriptions and produced a translation, which was then discussed at the 1925 International Congress of Orientalists at Oxford.

The interpretation is as follows:

"My Lord Christ, have mercy upon Afras son of Chaharbukht the Syrian, who cut this (or, who caused this to be cut)."

On the large cross, there is this additional sentence in Estrangelo Syriac. (Galatians 6:14)

"May I never boast except in the cross of our Lord Jesus Christ."

The inscription at Kadamattom church when translated is,

"I, the beautiful bird of Nineveh has come to this land. Written by me Shapper, who was saved by the Holy Messiah from misery."

== Stone crosses of Kerala ==
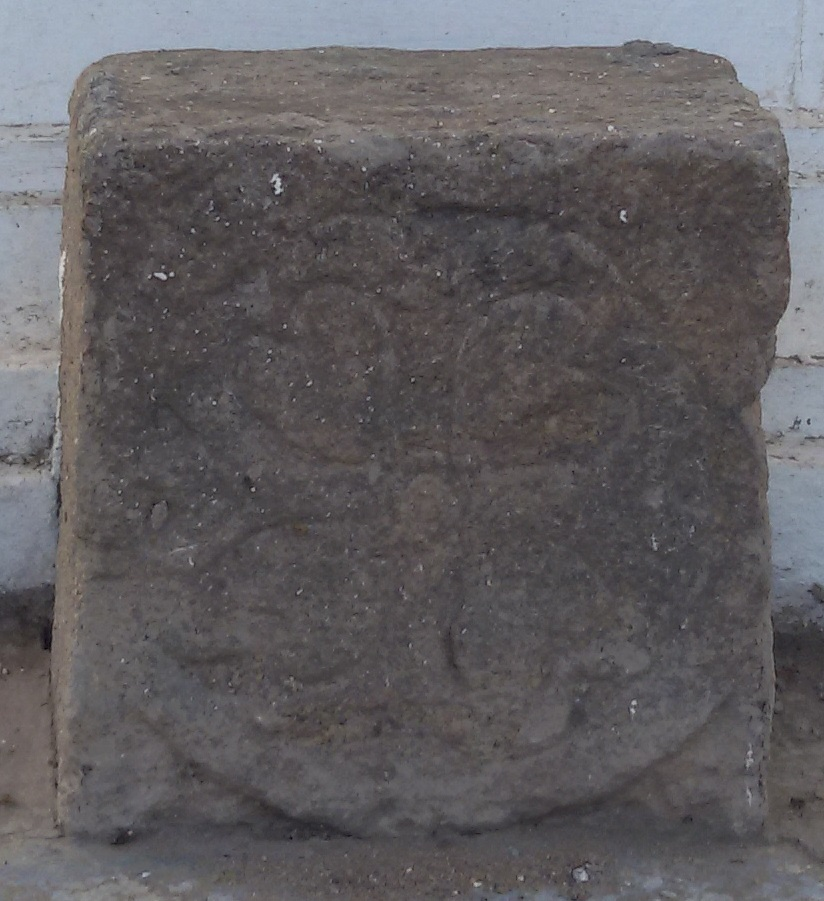
Kottakavu North Paravur Mar Thoma Sleeva founded by Mar Sabor and Mar Aphroth

Kottakkavu Mar Thoma Syro-Malabar Church, North Paravur and St Mary's Syro-Malabar Forane Church, Pallipuram under the Major Archeparchy of Ernakulam-Ankamaly of the Syro Malabar Church and St Mary's Orthodox Syrian Church, Niranam under the Niranam diocese of the Malankara Orthodox Syrian Church have the ancient, floriated Saint Thomas Christian crosses.

== Nasrani Sthambam ==
Nasrani Sthambams are giant open-air stone crosses. The plinths of these crosses represent lotus petals and lotus flowers, and they have square bases. They have various iconographic motifs, including elephants, peacocks and other animals. These crosses are found in Puthenchira, Parappukkara, Veliyanad, Kalpparambu, Angamaly, Kanjoor, Malayattoor, Udayamperoor, Kuravilangad, Uzhavoor, Chungam, Kaduthuruthy, Muthalakodam, Muttuchira, Kudamaloor, Niranam, Arakuzha, Kothamangalam, Chengannur, Thumpamon, Chathannur and many other places.

== See also ==
- Nestorian cross
