= Ayamkudy =

- village
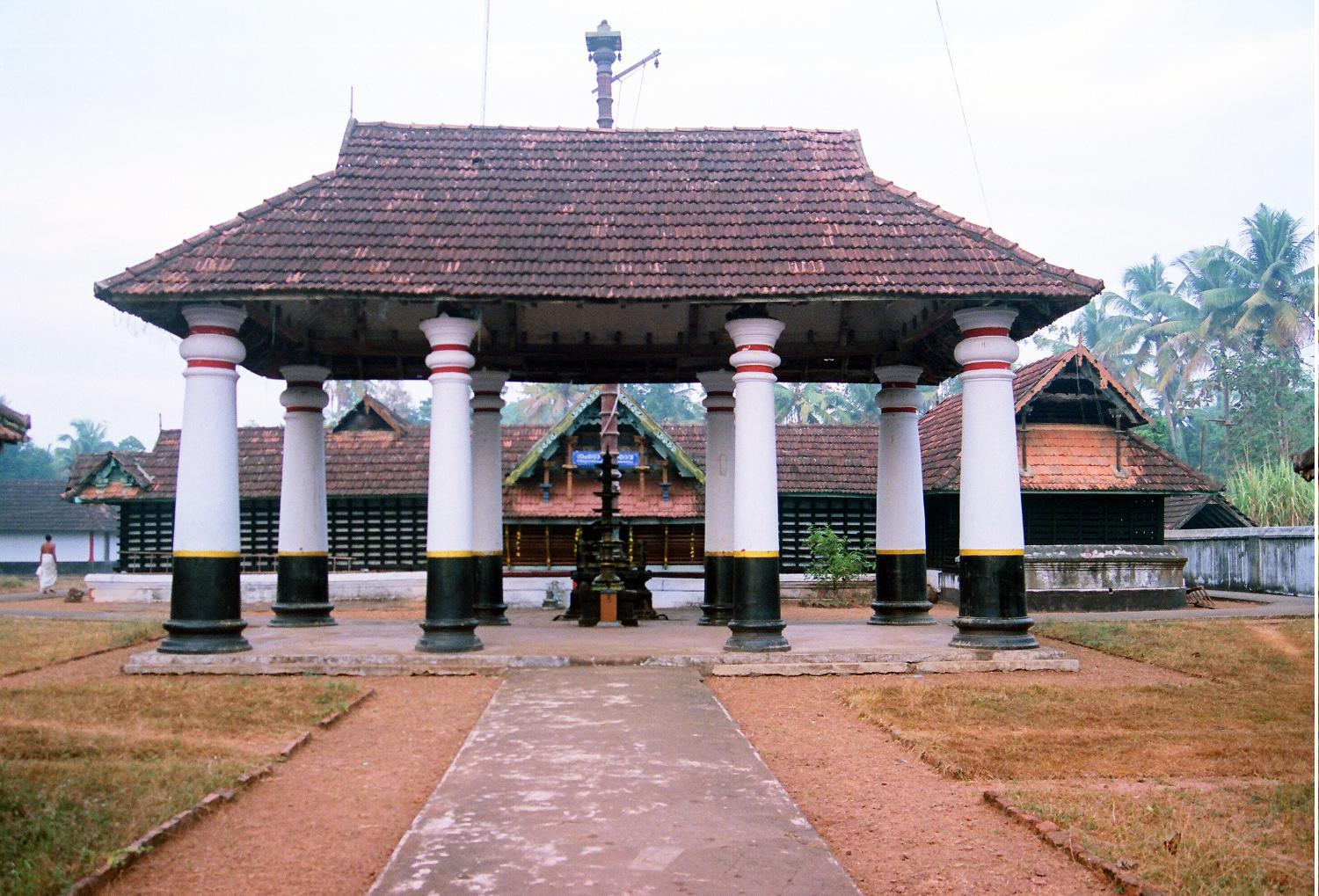
- Ayamkudy temple
- Interactive map of Ayamkudy
- Coordinates: 9.74973°N 76.473°E
- Country: India
- State: Kerala
- District: Kottayam
- Loksabha: Kottayam
- Vidhansabha: Kaduthuruthy
- Village: Muttuchira
- Panchayat: Kaduthuruthy

Area
  - Total: 1.75 km^{2} (0.68 sq mi)
- Elevation: 10–100 m (33–328 ft)

Languages
  - Official: Malayalam, English
- Time zone: UTC+5:30 (IST)
- Coastline: 0 kilometres (0 mi)
- Sex ratio: 1.017 ♂/♀
- Literacy: 100.0%
- Climate: Am (Köppen)

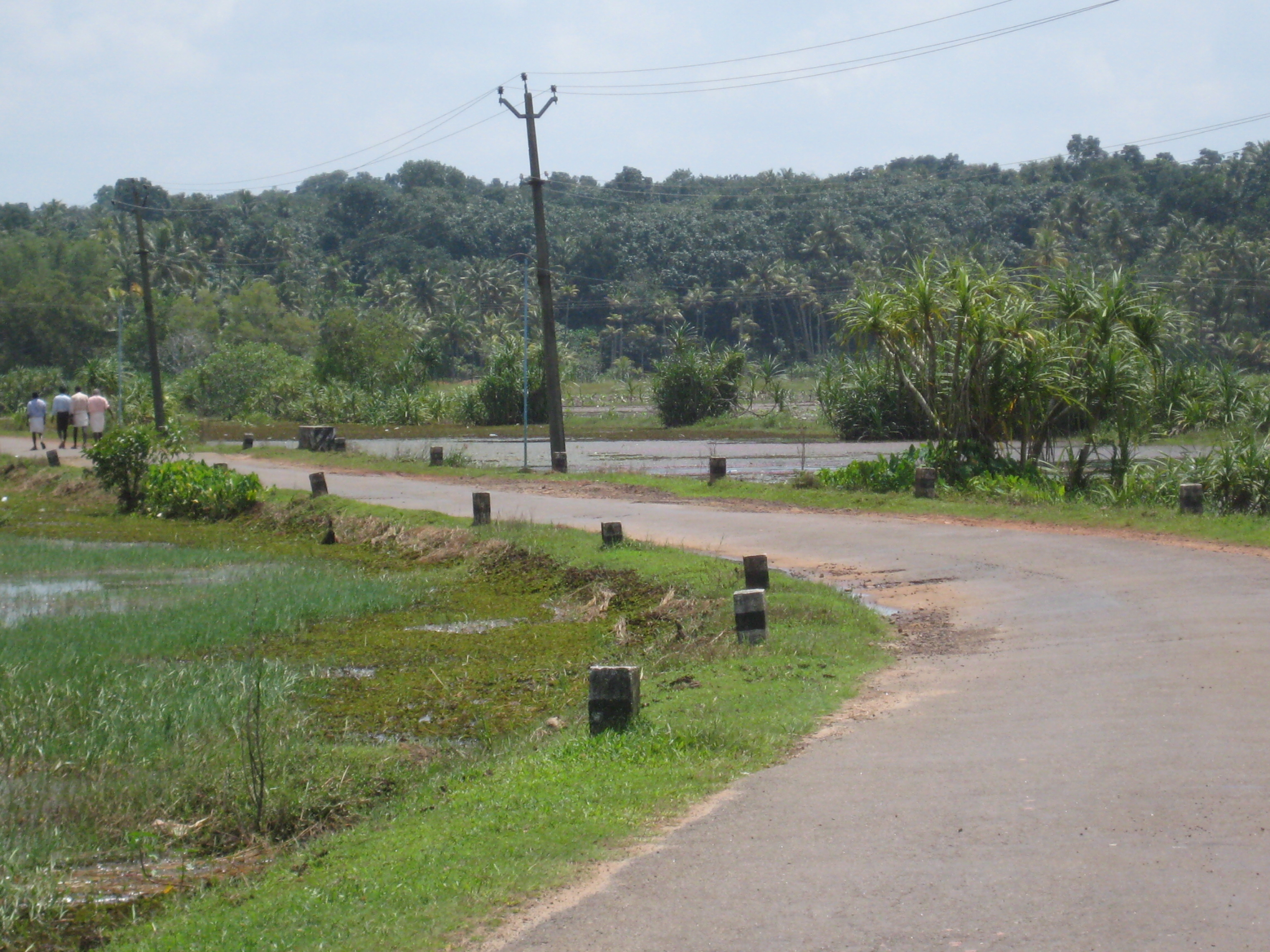
paddy fields

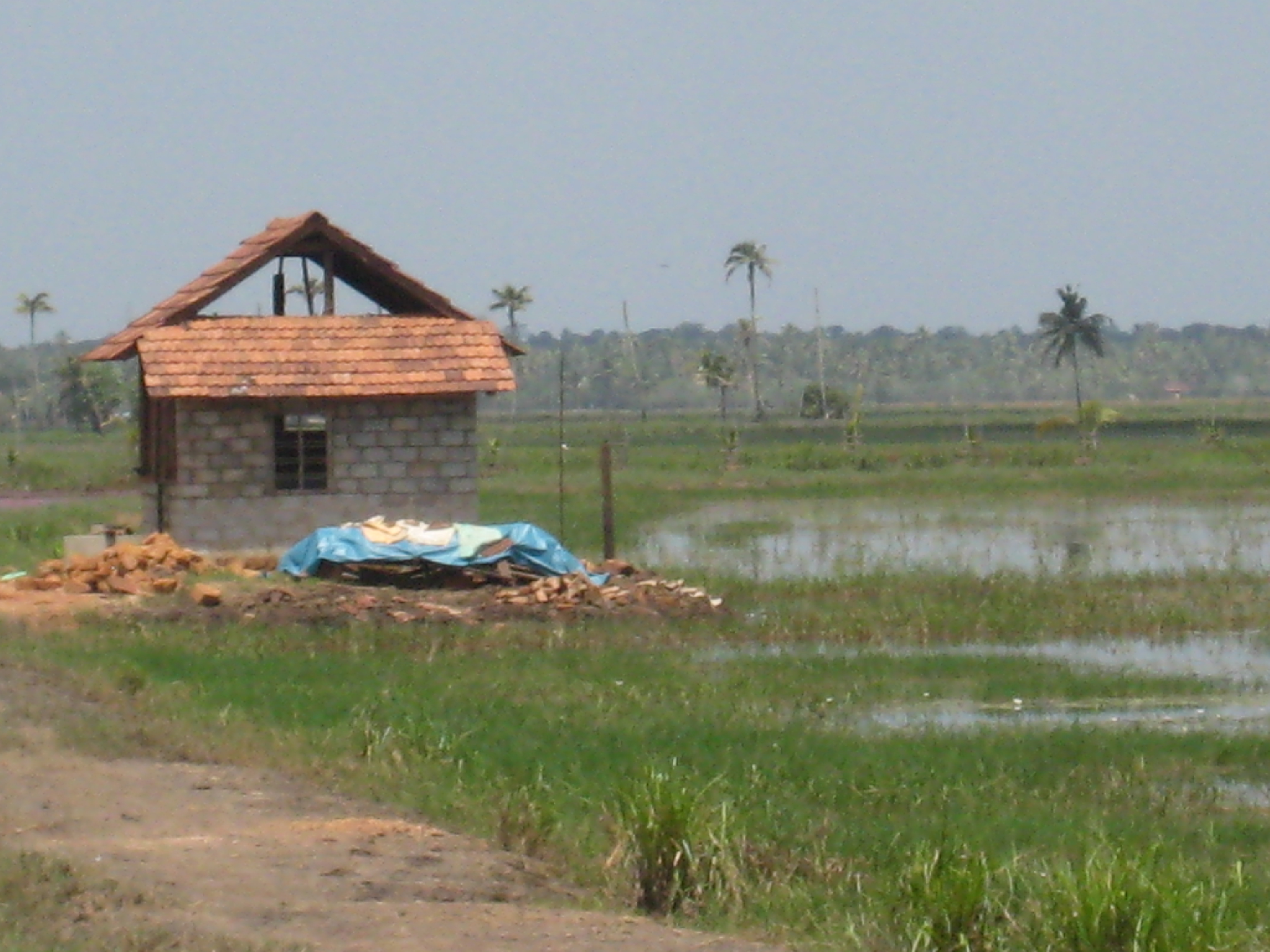
Village hut

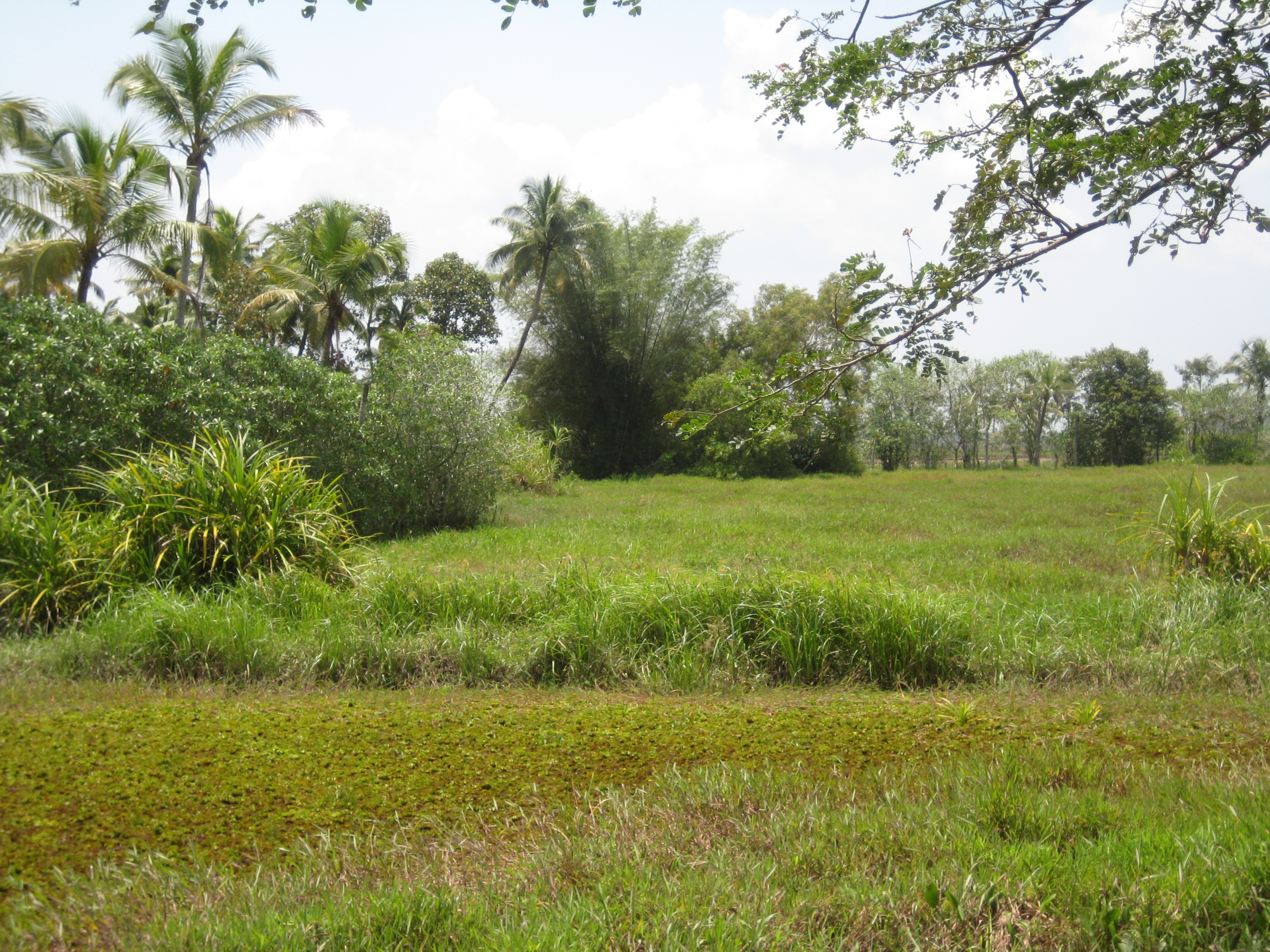
Ayamkudy village scene

Ayamkudy is a village in the Kottayam district of the Indian state of Kerala.

== Location & Access ==
Ayamkudy is located at 9°45'N & 76°28'E. It nestled in rubber plantations and surrendered by paddy fields and coconut lagoons. It is on the Kerala backwaters.

Ayamkudy is only slightly off from the road linking Kottayam and Ernakulam. Public buses are the best way to access Ayamkudy. There are few dozen buses plying between Kottayam and Vaikom, many of which have stops in Ayamkudy. Alternatively, one can hire a taxi/auto rickshaw from the nearby town of Kaduthuruthy, which is well connected to other cities and towns in the state.

Kottayam and Ernakulam are the nearest major railroad stations; Cochin International Airport (IATA: COK) is the nearest airport.

== Demographics ==
Ayamkudy is rather densely populated. Ayamkudians are divided roughly equally between Hindus and Christians. Ezhava, Pulayar, Nair, Ashari, Namboothiris are the most common Hindu castes.

== Institutions in Ayamkudy ==
Ayamkudy has three educational institutions: a Lower primary school, a High school and an English Medium school. It has a public library and a post office. There is a famous Lord Shiva temple (Thiruvayamkudy Mahadeva Kshetram), and also a Devi temple in the village. There are three Catholic churches: Malappuram St. Theresa Church, Maduravelli Infant Jesus Church, and Alphonsapuram Church.

== History of the temple ==
The history of the temple or its origin could be dated back as early as 1000 AD. The main idol is a Shivalingam, supposed to have appeared on its own in the homagni (sacred fire) in a Brahmin's house at Ayamkudy. This Brahmin (Namboothiri) was an ardent devotee of Vaikathappan (Lord Shiva), the main deity of the famous temple at Vaikom 15 kilometres (9.3 mi) away. According to legend, he was unable to get to the temple for worship due to his old age, so the deity of that temple (Vaikathappan) appeared in his Upasana Homagni. The temple was constructed later and it stands presently as the top center of the village. There seem to have been seven Ooranma families (owners) of the temple; however, only five still have living members. The present Ooranma Families include Pattamana Illam, Ettikkada Mana, Irishi Illam, Marangatta Mana and Neithasseri Mana.

The temple houses a Rahasya Ara (secret cabin) where the divine power is located. This is considered a reservoir for the power of the idol. The cabin is well protected with granite stones. A lamp is lighted every day in front of it, before the other main lamps are lighted. A serpent is believed to be sitting in front of this to safeguard the place.

There is also a water well, with a perennial spring of cool water. This believed to have a connection with the Ganges, originating from the divine head of Lord Shiva. Although the well is situated in the uppermost part of the village, its water has never gone below a certain level, even when most of the wells in the village have dried up.

The Ayamkudy village has been a center for learning Rig Veda, with many experts resident in the village. Education in the Rig Veda takes nearly seven years; the coaching was always associated with the temple.

Until recently, the temple has also been known for its assets in the form of land. However, the situation has dramatically changed in the recent past.

== Festival ==
The festival in the temple is associated with Mahasivaraathri. It comes in the Malayalam month of Kumbha. The festival starts with Kodiyettu. The six-day festival ends with the Aaraattu (Holy Bath), which is conducted on the Amaavasi day (new moon) in this month. This usually falls on the very next day of Mahasivaraathri.

The main functions associated with the festival are Kalabhabhishekam, Kodiyettu, Uthsavabali, Sreebhoothabali, Mulapooja, Sivaraathri Pooja, Pallivetta, Vilakkezhunnelipu, and Aarattu. Also festival in St. Thersa's church in October is famous, a lot of people irrespective of religion are coming to church on that day &
