= Jacob of Muttuchira =

16th-century Saint Thomas Christian archdeacon

- Archdeacon of All India
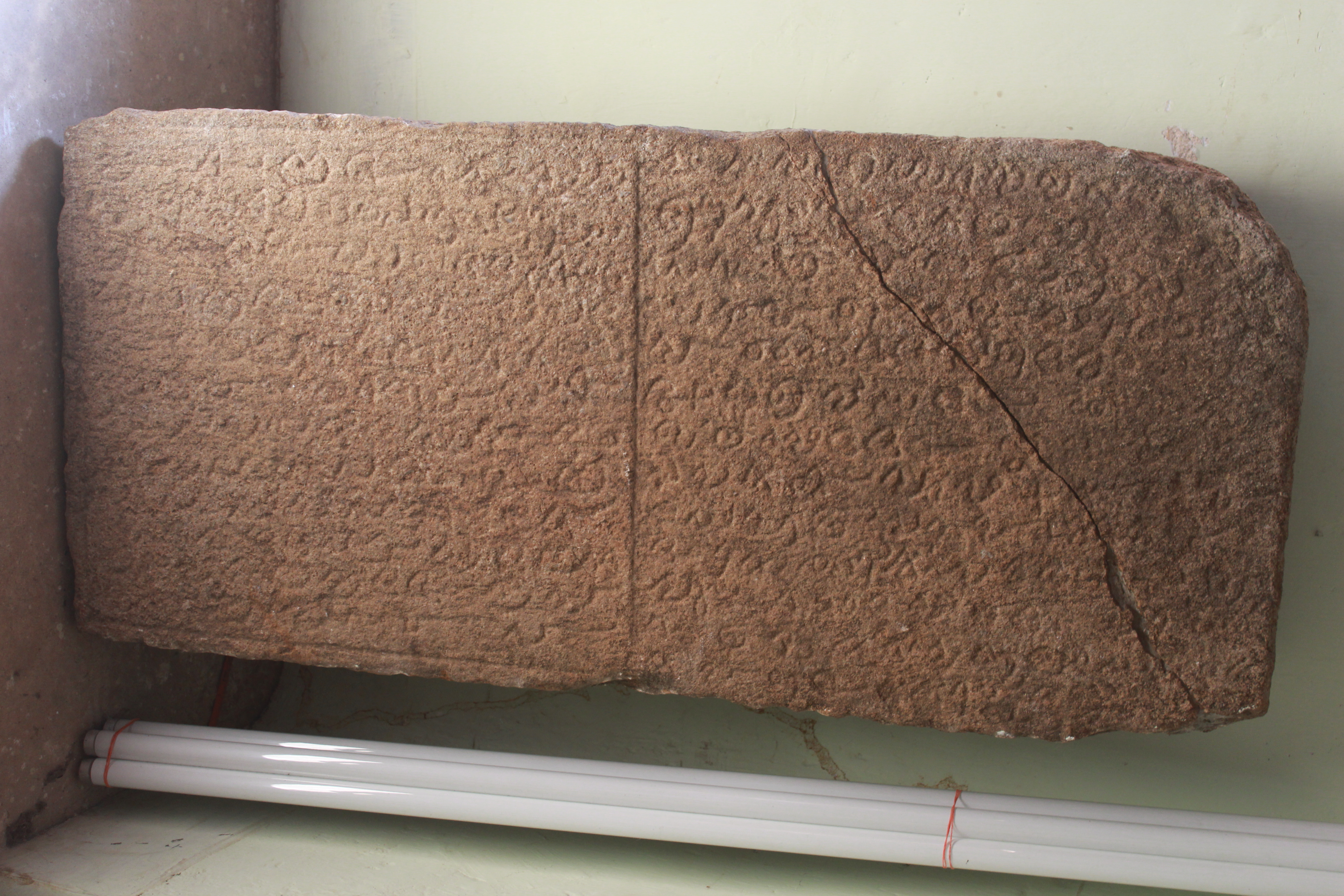
- Lithic inscriptions from the Church in Muttuchira
- Appointed: by Metropolitan Simeon
- Predecessor: Giwargis the Elder
- Opposed to: Givargis of Christ

Jacob Pakalomattam (died 1596) was an Archdeacon of the Saint Thomas Christian community in India in the years preceding the Synod of Diamper in 1599. He was a native of Muttuchira and belonged to the Pakalomattam dynastic family. His activities were based in the Church of Ruha d'Qudisha in Muttuchira. He owed his staunch allegiance to the traditionalist Eliah Patriarchate of the Church of the East and Metropolitan Mar Shemon, who was sent to India by Patriarch Eliya VI Barmama. He protested against the Latinising attempts of the Portuguese Padroado and resisted the Chaldean Catholic attempts of reconciliation led by Joseph Sulaqa and Abraham of Angamaly. Throughout his archdeaconate, he is known to have rebelled against the Chaldean Catholic archdeacons including Givargis of Cross.

== Life ==
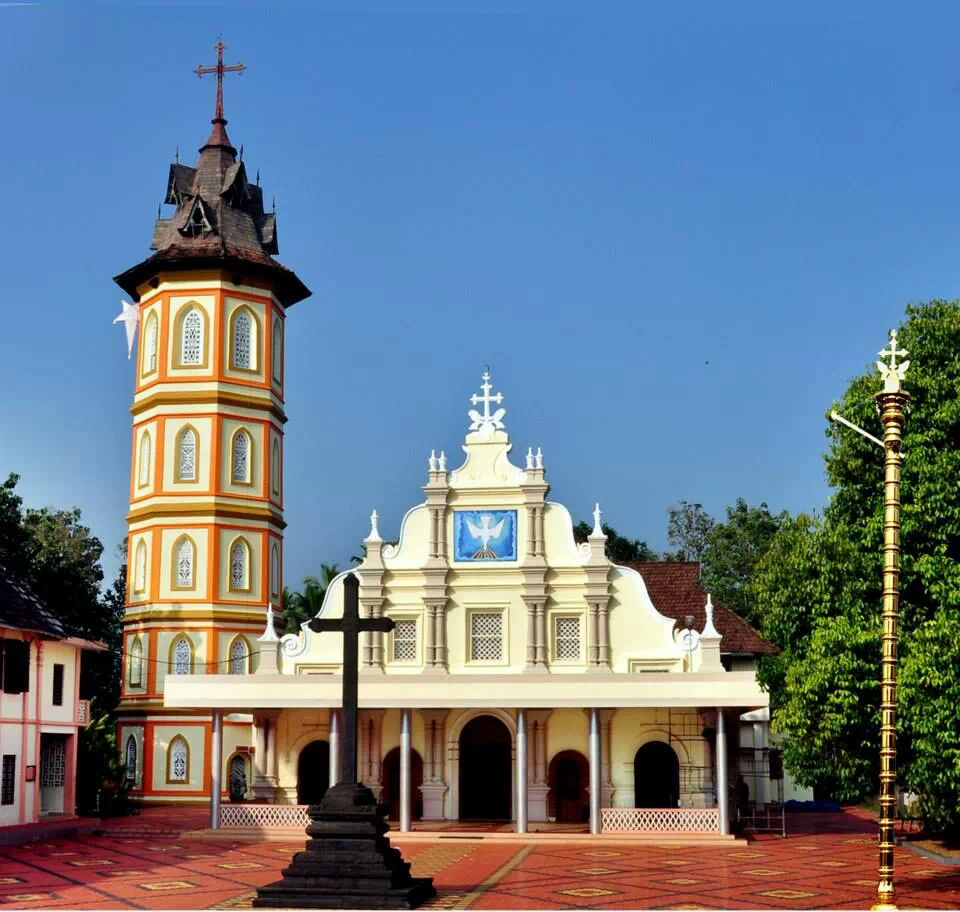
Church Ruha d'Qudisha, Muttuchira

Archdeacon Jacob was born to the Nadackal line of Pakalomattam family in Muttuchira. Traditionally it had been the privilege of the eldest priest belonging to Pakalomattam to be the Archdeacon of the Saint Thomas Christians. The position of Archdeacon is the highest clerical rank in the Church of the East after a bishop. He is the head of all the clerics belonging to a diocese and he is incharge of the cathedral church and represents the will of the bishop in his absence. Since India was an exterior province of the Church of the East and since the Patriarch reserved for himself the right to send Metropolitans to India, the effective ecclesiastical authority vested on the native Archdeacon. Archdeaconate was not just an ecclesiastical institution, but a socio-political and ethno-religious, princely authority, that represented the integrity of the Christian community of Hendo (India).

Following the schism of 1552, by which a faction of the Church of the East entered into obedience to the Holy See, both the Eliah Patriarchate (Nestorian) and the Shemon Patriarchate (Chaldean Catholic) contested for the right to send bishops to India. Apparently, the first to send a prelate to India was the Nestorian Patriarch, Simeon VII Denkha. The prelate whom he sent was Mar Abraham, who must have reached Malabar before 1556. At the same time, Patriarch Abdisho IV Maron (1555-1567) sent Mar Joseph Sulaqa to Malabar. However Mar Joseph could not reach Malabar before 1558. Alerted by the presence of Mar Abraham, the Portuguese Padroado allowed Mar Joseph to occupy the see as the Metropolitan of the East Syriac Christians. Later Mar Abraham was captured and forced to confess Catholic faith and was sent back to Mesopotamia by the Portuguese missionaries. Following this, the Roman Catholic Inquisition also captured Mar Joseph and sent him to Lisbon from where he reached Rome to meet the pope. Mar Joseph returned to Malabar in 1564 but was again captured and deported to Rome by the Roman Catholic missionaries in 1567. Meanwhile, Mar Abraham was gone over to the Chaldean Catholic side and was consecrated as Catholic bishop and was sent to India with the approval of the pope. Since Mar Abraham had gone over to the Chaldaean Catholic side, the Nestorian Patriarch, Mar Eliah VI (1576-1591), sent another bishop, Mar Simeon, to Malabar in 1576. Mar Simeon appointed Jacob of Muttuchira as his Archdeacon. Alarmed by the presence of the new bishop, the Portuguese missionaries allowed Mar Abraham to occupy the see. Mar Simeon was captured by Franciscan missionaries in 1584 and sent to Rome where his priestly orders were declared invalid and forced to remain until his death in 1559. Although the missionaries were successful in this, the presence of the rebellious Archdeacon Jacob who according to them resisted all attempts of latinisations, forced them to let Mar Abraham to govern the Malabar Christians until his death in 1597.

Archdeacon Jacob maintained his authority and support among the native Christians even after Mar Simeon had been deported to Portugal. He maintained constant touch with Mar Simeon through letters in which Mar Simeon was addressed as the Metropolitan of India. He based his administration in Muttuchira and built the Prasu Church and rebuilt the older Church of Ruha D’ Qudisha. He also built churches at Kothanalloor, Elanji, and other regions. He refused to accept Mar Abraham, since numerous Latin innovations were already being interpolated into the Malabar rite under Mar Abraham's jurisdiction as prescribed by the Goan synods, in which Mar Abraham attended as instructed by the pope. Archdeacon Jacob rejected the Gregorian Calendar and taught his followers to recite the traditional Chaldean raza without the Latin interpolations. Dom Alexis de Menezes, the Archbishop of Goa and the mastermind of the Synod of Diamper, wrote to him that Mar Simeon had been convicted and his orders were declared invalid by the pope in Rome, in attempt to force the archdeacon to submit to the Papal authority and even offered him large promises and favours in return. But Archdeacon Jacob rejected Menezes' attempts and was finally excommunicated by Menezes.

Archdeacon Jacob died in 1596 and was entombed in the old Ruha d'Qudisha Church (currently church of Saint Francis of Assisi) in Muttuchira. Meanwhile, a funerary epitaph discovered from an excavation in the old church's floor documents the death of a 'Father Chacko', who is identified to be Archdeacon Jacob, seemingly on Dhanu 7, ME 769 (December 20, 1593).

== Lithic inscription at Muttuchira ==
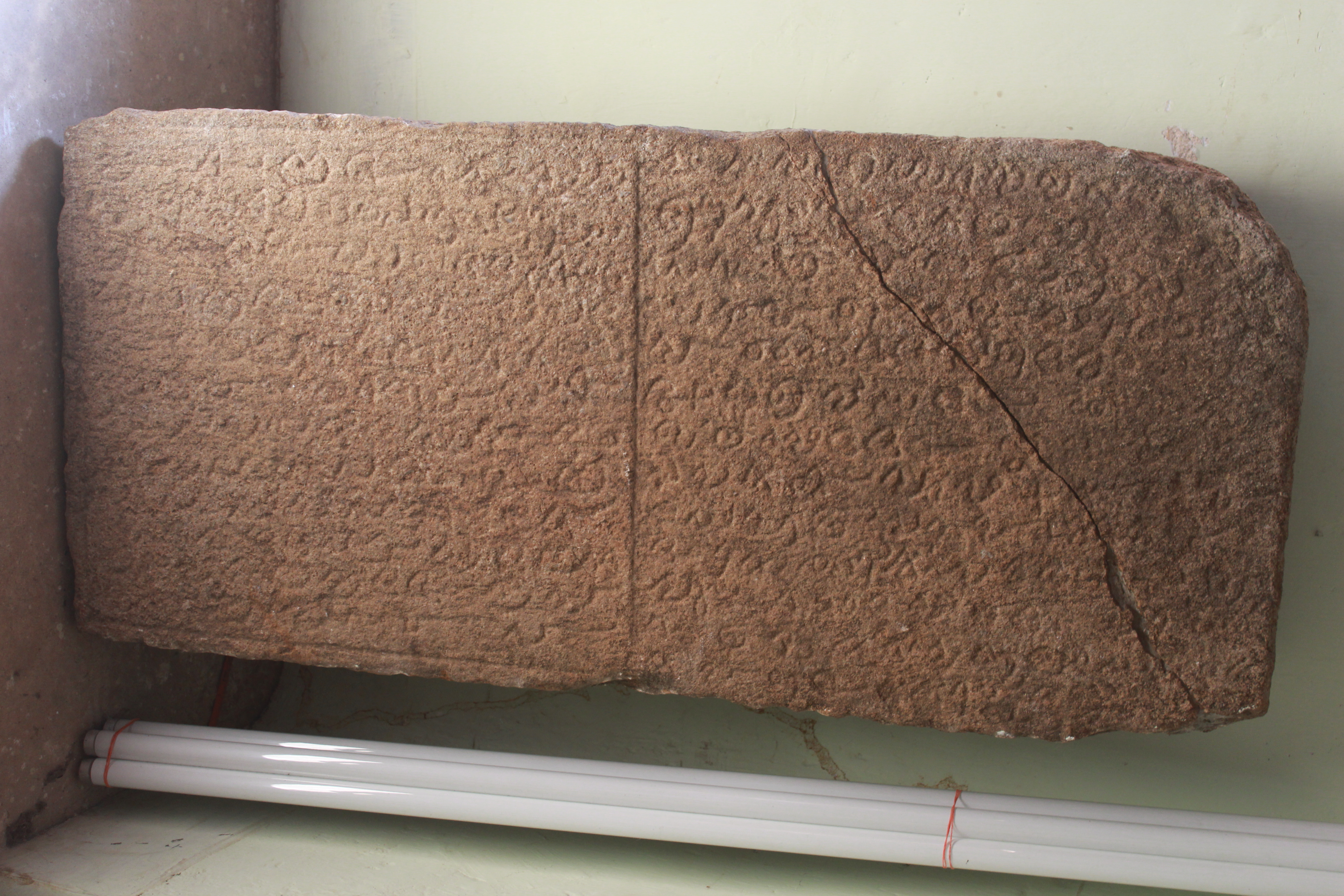
Ancient Rock Inscription from Muttuchira Ruh d'Qudisha Church.

Following is the English translation of the inscription on the granite plaque:

By the command of the lord in AD 1528 Mar Thana [Mar Denha] and Mar Avu [ Jacob Abuna ] along with Giwargis Padre, installed this Holy Cross in this place. After this, Giwargis padre went to Portugal along with his nephew Mathai padre. In AD 1580, kanni 13 sunday, on the day of the feast of Holy Cross, this mar Sliva was erected covered in wood, by Bishop Mar Simon and Jacob [Archdeacon Jacob] Padre. Same year, on the day of 18th on the day of the feast, this bleeding Cross was installed. AD 1581 meenam month on the 29th friday good friday, this granite Cross was installed.

== Bibliography ==
- Martin Thomas, Antony (2015). Thekeparampil, Jacob; Koonammakkal, Thomas; Varghese, Baby (eds.). "MUTTUCHIRA SLIVA AND LITHIC INSCRIPTIONS- LANDMARK MONUMENTS OF SAINT THOMAS CHRISTIANS OF INDIA". The Harp. XXX.
- Perczel, István (2018). Fabre, Pierre-Antoine [in French]; Županov, Ines G. (eds.). Mar Shim'on and Archdeacon Jacob: Nestorian Resistance and the Contours of a Shared Culture (1577 - 1593). 'Accommodationist Strategies on the Malabar Coast: Competition Or Complementarity?'; The Rites Controversies in the Early Modern World; Studies in Christian Mission. Vol. 53. Leiden: Brill. p. 201. doi:10.1163/9789004366299_010. ISBN 9789004366299. OCLC 1031917853.
