= Poozhikol =

Poozhikol Karikkakuzhi
- village
- Country: India
- State: Kerala
- District: Kottayam

Government
  - Body: Kaduthuruty & Mulakkulam panchayath

Languages
  - Official: Malayalam, English
- Time zone: UTC+5:30 (IST)
- PIN: 686604
- Vehicle registration: KL-36
- Nearest city: Kaduthuruthy
- Lok Sabha constituency: Kottayam
- Civic agency: Kaduthuruty & Mulakkulam panchayath
- Climate: Tropical (Köppen)

Poozhikol, also known as Karikkakuzhi, is a remote place in India, which lies in both Kaduthuruthy and Mulakkulam Panchayats in Kottayam district of Kerala.

== Location ==
Poozhikol lies in between Appanchira on the south-west, Keezhoor (Njarukunnu) on the north and Mangadu on the east.

== Transportation ==
The village, once very remote and agrarian, is now very well connected to near towns by roads. Now a KSRTC venad bus is running a service.

== History ==
All the developmental institutions were attributed to the forefathers of the present generation with the efforts of Late Fr.Lukose Manalel, a.k.a. Manalel achan, and Fr. Jacob Kollaparambil.

== Schools ==
There is a lower primary school named St.Luke's LP School and upper primary school named St.Martha's UP School. It has a school for the mentally challenged and an old age home.

== Churches ==
Poozhikkol has 3 churches. St.Luke's Knanaya church belongs to Kottayam diocese. St.Antony's church belongs to Pala Dioceses. There is CSI church also present.

== Celebrities ==
Former Chief Justice of India Shri K.G Balakrishnan also belong from Poozhikol.
