= Thalayolaparambu =

- Town
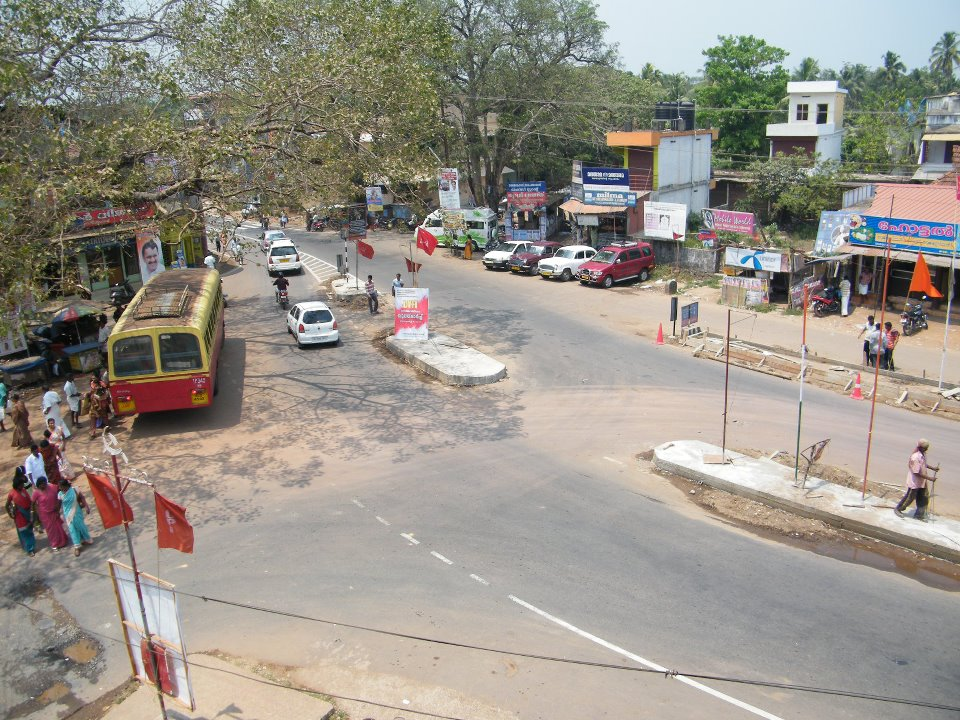
- Thalayolaparambu Main Junction

- Location in Kerala, India Thalayolaparambu (India)
- Coordinates: 9.785°N 76.4481°E
- Country: India
- State: Kerala
- District: Kottayam
- Taluk: Vaikom

Government
  - Body: Grama Panchayat
  - Panchayat President: Shiji Vincent Chandiyil

Area
  - Total: 19.3 km^{2} (7.5 sq mi)

Population (2011)
  - Total: 22,571
  - Density: 1,170/km^{2} (3,030/sq mi)

Languages
  - Official: Malayalam, English
- Time zone: UTC+5:30 (IST)
- PIN: 686605
- Telephone code: 04829
- Vehicle registration: KL-36, KL-05
- Sex ratio: 0.99 ♂/♀
- Literacy: 99%
- Lok Sabha constituency: Kottayam
- Nearest city: Vaikom

Thalayolaparambu is a town situated in Kottayam district in Kerala, India. Spanning over an area of 19.3 square kilometres with a population of 22,571 people, this mini-town is home to some of the well-known personalities such as the former Chief minister of Travancore-Cochin A. J. John, Anaparambil, the late Malayalam novelist/writer Vaikom Muhammed Basheer, the former Chief Justice of India K. G. Balakrishnan, and KK. Thalayolaparambu also hosts the major market established during the administration of Velu Thampi Dalawa, and is one of those few Keralite markets that still retains its old-world charm till date.

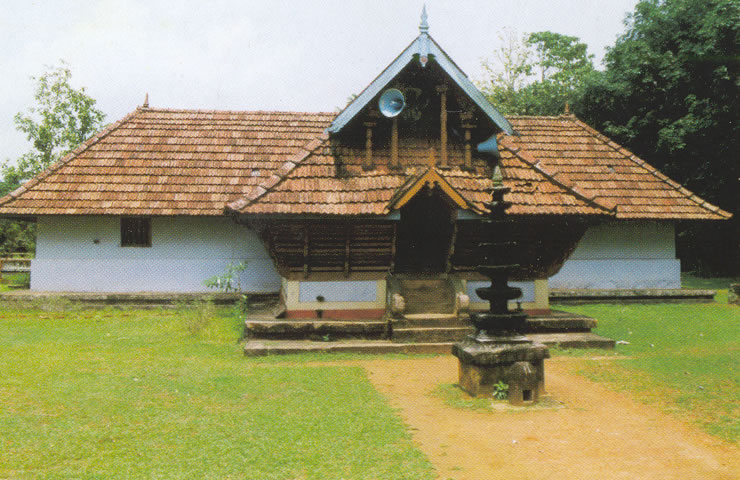
Pundareekapuram temple

== History ==
History of this region is related to Venad. Venattarachan gave a part of his kingdom to the minister of Chazhi Illam as a gift for killing the king of Vadakkumkoor. Those places which was written in the first 'Thaaliola' came to be known as Thalayoalaparambu.

== Economy ==
This town hosts the biggest market (Malayalam: ചന്ത ) of the locality which was founded by Velu Thampi Dalawa and now run by the Panchayat. This market opens twice in a week on Tuesdays and Saturdays. It attracts producers, consumers and businessmen from the nearby panchayats including Vaikom, Keezhoor and Kaduthuruthy. In olden times the products from the Kottayam Division High Range were sent to Kochi- Alappuzha markets through this market. Previously economy of this region was mainly concentrated on this market's activities.

Muvattupuzha river which passes through this region is an important factor for the economic activity of this region. In earlier times, large barges, much like country boats, transported goods from Alapuzha to Thalayolaparambu through the intricate networks of waterways. Agriculture is the main occupation of the people here.

Currently construction Industry is a main contributor to the economy of this region. River sand mining, manufacturing of cement bricks, clay bricks, concrete construction materials are all parts of this industry. Previously Sand mining industry was a major job provider in the area. New regulatory reforms in the industry has brought down the attractiveness of this industry. The growth of construction material industry has resulted in the growth of logistics sector as well, with exponential increase in the trucks in the locality transporting construction materials to neighboring districts.

A small portion of the population is in Persian Gulf countries. Remittances from them is also playing a big role in improving the economy. The Panchayat is setting up a Bus Terminal cum shopping mall of 75000sq.ft. of international standards in the heart of the town which will definitely explore new vistas of development.

Access to credit of the region has improved a lot from the past. Currently 6 banks including Federal Bank, South Indian Bank, State Bank of Travancore, State Bank of India, North Malabar Gramin Bank, and Canara Bank have branches at Thalayolaparambu. Canara Bank, South Indian Bank, State Bank of Travancore, and Federal Bank have its ATMs at Thalayolaparambu. UAE Xchange, KSFE, Manappuram Finance and Muthoot Group is also have its branches at Thalayolaparambu.

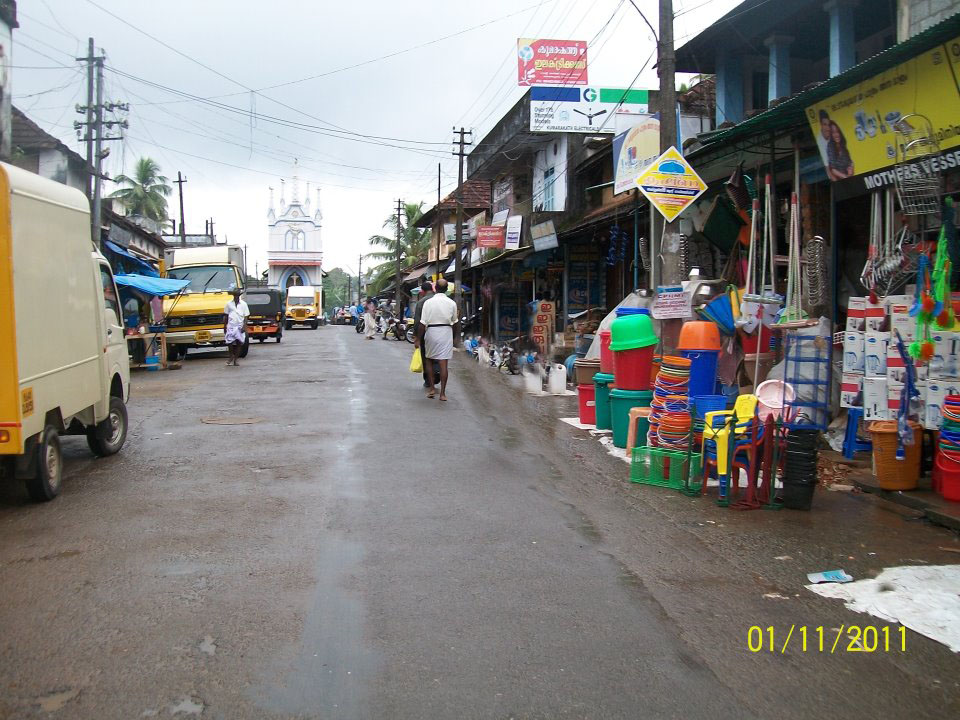
Thalayolaparambu Market

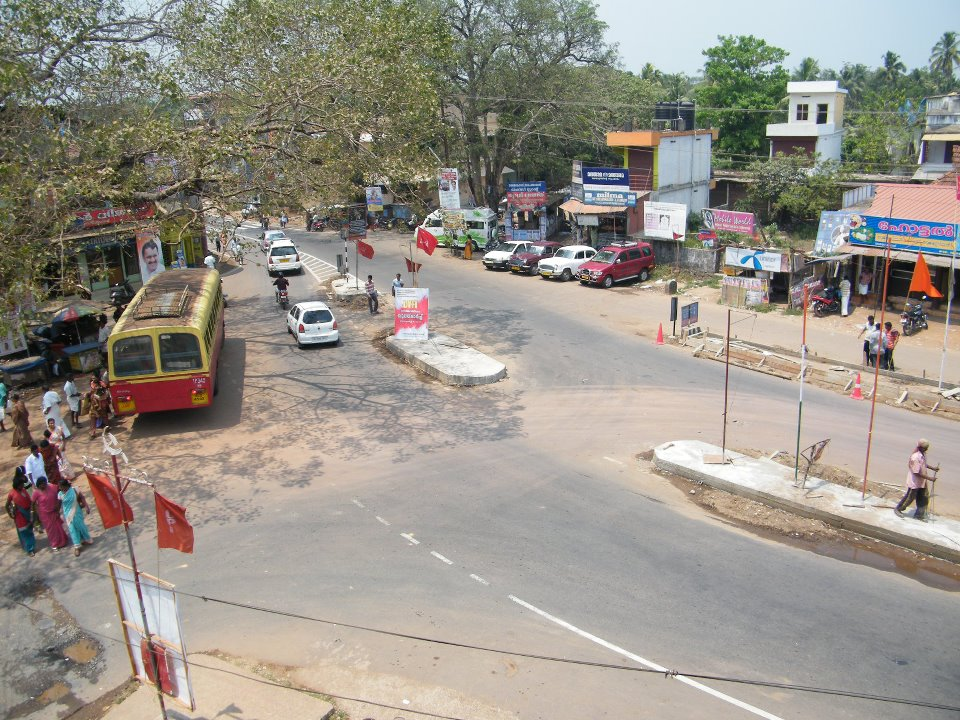
Thalayolaparambu Town

== Culture ==
=== Temples, churches, mosques ===
The religious harmony of the place is evident as one can see the churches, temples and mosques situated close to each other. Thalayolaparambu is home for eight Hindu Temples, four Churches and two Mosques. These places hosts ancient and modern artworks. Tourists from all over the world are attracted to these places.

The four churches in Thalayolaparambu are St. George Church, St. Michael's Church, Infant Jesus Church and St. Antony's Church. St. George Church, Thalayolaparambu is an important Catholic church in Kerala. The first Church was founded by St. Kuriakose Elias Chavara, the then Vicar General for the Syrian Catholics under the Archbishopm of Verapoly. The Church was reconstructed under the visionary leadership of Rev.Fr. Joseph D. Thekkinen in 1972. This church is situated beside the Kottayam – Ernakulam road at Pallikavala junction, Thalayolaparambu. The reconstructed church was inaugurated by Cardinal Joseph Parecattil on 31 December 1972 which was apparently the same day of the centenary remembrance of St. Thomas. The same Church was renovated in 2022 to mark the Golden Jubilee of its dedication. The Feasts of St. Sebastian, St. George, Mother Mary are celebrated here. This church is said to be the first pilgrim centre where the novena to Our Lady of Perpetual Succour began long back. Every saturday, thousands flock to this Church to attend the Novena and other prayers.

Among the temples in Thalayolaparambu Pundareekapuram temple is famous for its wall paintings. The walls of the sanctum sanctorum of the temple are covered with exquisite paintings which depict episodes from the Hindu myths and Puranas. The murals in this temple are some of the best in Kerala. It is situated in Midayikunnam. Sree Krishna temple, Sree Mathanam Bhagavathi temple, Sree Karthyayani Devi temple, Sree Elamkavu Devi temple, Thrikkarayikkulam Mahadeva temple, Pothy Mahavishnu temple, Pattupurackal Devi temple and Palamkadavu Sree Durga Devatha temple are also located in this area.

Another important cultural feature of this region is the annual festival (Attuvela) hosted by the Vadayar Ilamkavu temple. A procession is done through the Muvattupuzha river as part of the festival. The main attraction of the procession is the three storied artifact specially made in large barges for the event. These barges are part of the procession which held at night. All the boats will be decorated using electric lights. This festival attracts a lot of tourists including people from across the world.

Mohiyudheen masjid situated in the market is one of the important mosques in this locality. History of this mosque goes back to centuries. The pillars and the artwork inside the mosque reflects traditional Kerala architecture. The whole building reminds a traditional 'nalukettu'. Other mosques in this locality includes Vettikkattumukku Juma Masjid, Salafi Masjid, Sainudheen thangal thaikavu, and Palankadavu thaikavu. There are madrasas functioning in Thalayolaparambu, Palamkadavu and Vettikkattumukku. Vaikom Muhammed Basheer did his religious schooling in the madrasa at Palankadavu.

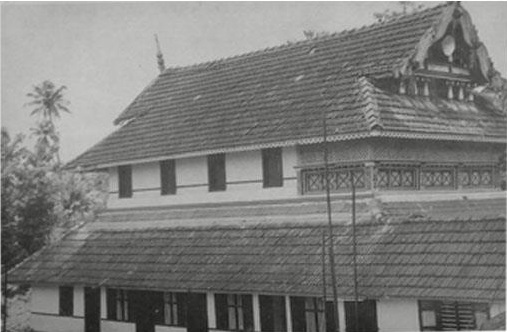
An old picture of Mohiyudheen Masjid, Thalayolaparambu

=== Literature ===
Thalayolaparambu has made prominent literary personalities. Legendary Malayalam writer Vaikom Mohmmed Basheer was born at Thalayolaparambu. Places in Thalayolaparambu forms an integral part of the novel Paaththummaayude aadu written by the same author.

=== Entertainment ===
There are two cinema theatres in Thalayolaparambu. Nice Movie House and Carnival Cinemas includes three A/C multiplexes with one big theatre and two mini theatres.

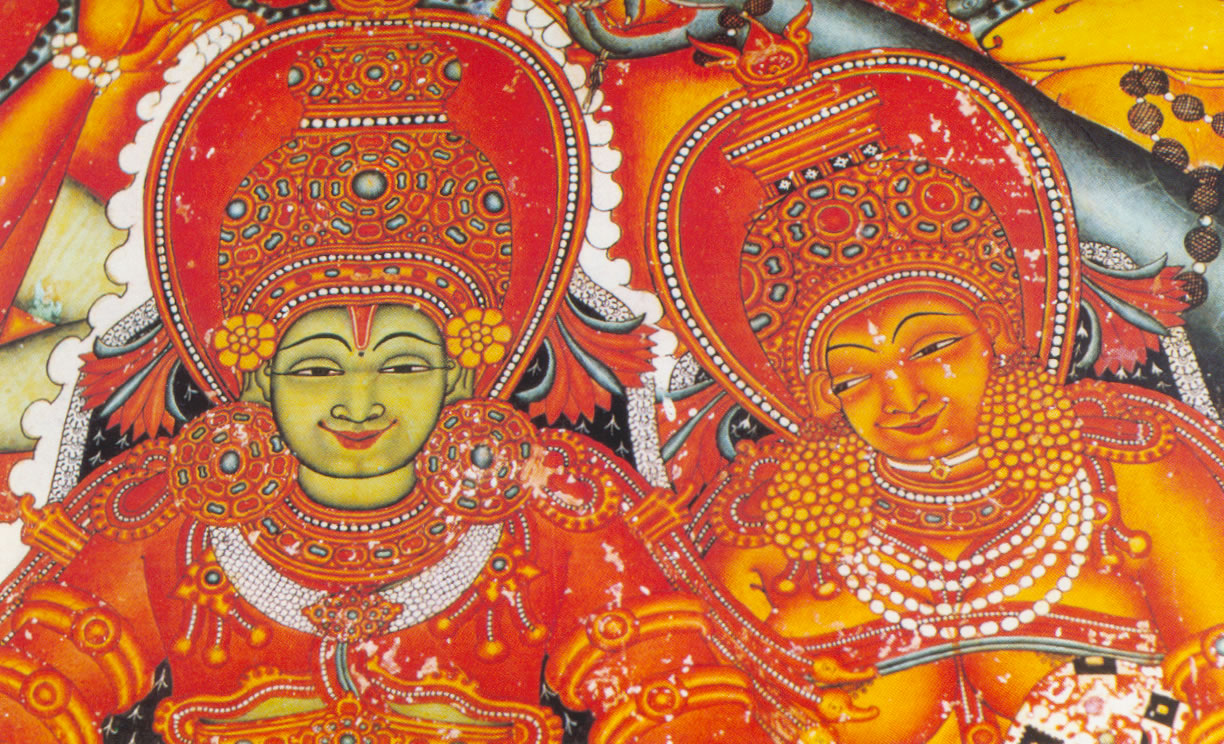
Mural in Thalayolaparamba

== Notables ==
- Vaikom Muhammad Basheer Malayalam Novelist
- Justice K. G. Balakrishnan Former Chief Justice of India
- A. J. John Former Chief Minister of Travancore-Cochin, Former Governor Madras

== Healthcare ==
There are many hospitals in/near Thalayolaparambu including

- The Government hospital
- The Mercy Hospital in Pothy
- Medical Laboratory Darsana Lab & ECG

== Education ==
There are several high-schools and two colleges in Thalayolaparambu.

Colleges

- Dewaswom Board College, Thalayolaparambu

Parallel Colleges

- Universal College
- Kairali College
- Victory Institute of Education

Schools

- Govt. U.P School, Thalayolaparambu
- Govt. L.P.G.S, Thalayolaparambu
- A.L.P.S, Midayikkunnam
- A.J. John Memorial Girls Higher Secondary School
- Government Vocational Higher Secondary School
- St. George English Medium Higher Secondary School, Thalayolaparambu
- Little flower L.P. School Pothy, Thalayolaparambu
- Holy family U.P. School, Pothy, Thalayolaparambu
- Govt.U.P.School, Elamkave
- Mar Sleeba U.P.School, Vadayar
- St. Louis L.P.School, Vadayar
- Infant Jesus High School, Vadayar
- Assisi Special School, Thalayolaparambu

== Geography ==
This panchayat is 19.3 square kilometers in area. The borders of the region are covered by various panchyats. In the south Thalayazham, Kallara, Kaduthuruthy Panchayats forms the borders, while in north are Mulakulam, Velloor Panchayats. Mulakulam, Kaduthuruthy Panchayats forms the eastern part and Maravanthuruthu, Velloor and Udayanapuram Panchayats forms the western part of the region.

Neighbouring cities & towns

== Demographics ==
The total population of Thalayolaparambu as per census 2001 is 22145. Out of this 10884 are male and 11261 are female. The literacy of this place is also encouraging. The literacy rate of the region is 95%. Scheduled castes and Scheduled Tribes forms 13% of the population.
