= Statue of Parashurama =

Parashurama Statue
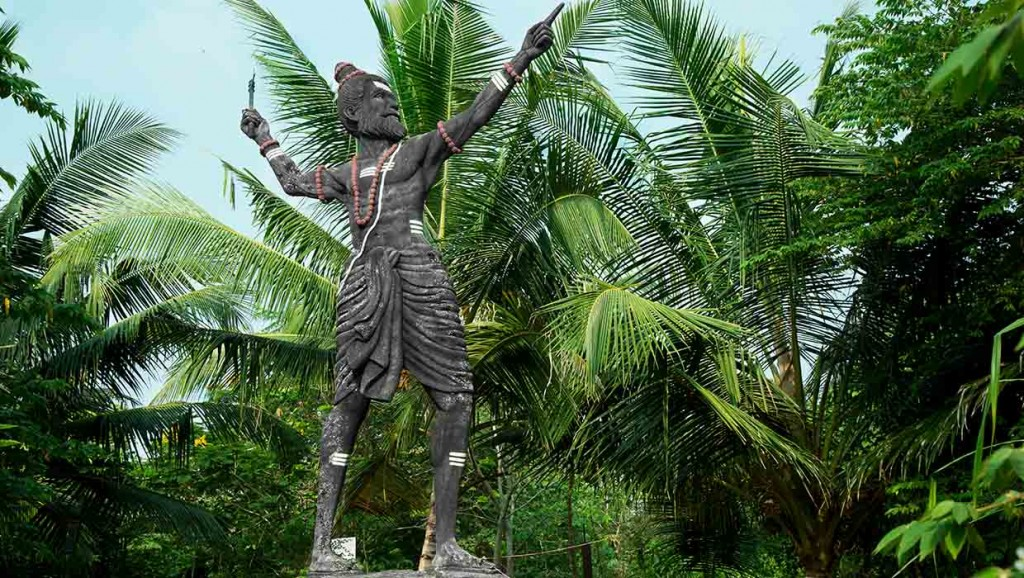
- Statue in Mango meadows.
- Interactive map of Parashurama Statue
- Location: Kaduthuruthy, Kottayam, Kerala, India
- Coordinates: 9.744301°N 76.471517°E
- Type: statue
- Height: 9.144 metres (30.00 ft)
- Completion date: 2015

The tallest Statue of Parashurama is located at Mango meadows Agricultural Theme Park, Kaduthuruthy, Kerala, India.

== About the statue ==
The height of the statue is about 30 feet. Parashurama is the sixth avatar of Vishnu in Hinduism. He is one of the chiranjeevis (immortal) of Hinduism and is believed to have lived during the Treta Yuga and Dvapara Yuga. He is also known as the father of Kalarippayattu.
