= P. C. Thomas (politician, born 1938) =

Indian politician

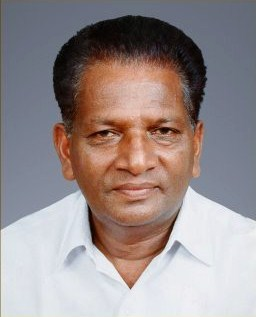
- Thomas Chacko Pannivelil
- Born: February 26, 1938
- Died: May 27, 2009 (aged 71)

P. C. Thomas (26 February 1938 – 27 May 2009) in full Pannivelil Chacko Thomas, was an Indian politician and an MLA in the Kerala Legislative Assembly. He represented Kaduthuruthy constituency in Kottayam district, Kerala.

== Life ==
He was the son of Mariamma and Chacko of the Pannivelil house in Eravimangalam.

== Career ==
He worked as a teacher and was headmaster at St. Michaels High School, Kaduthuruthy. He was elected to the 7th and 8th Kerala Legislature.

Thomas was the chairman of the Committee on Petitions (1987–1989), president of the Kaduthuruthy Panchayat, and chairman of the Block Development Committee in Kaduthuruthy.

On 27th of May 2009, Thomas died at the age of 71, he was survived by his wife, Ancy, and their two sons and daughter.
