= Pundareekapuram Temple =

Hindu temple in Kottayam district, Kerala

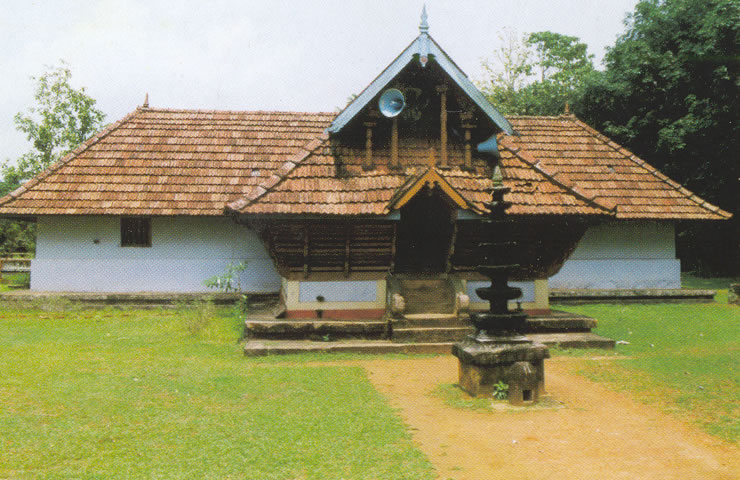
- Pundareekapuram Temple in 2011

- Pundareekapuram Temple, Thalayolaparambu, Kottayam, Kerala

Religion
- Affiliation: Hinduism
- District: Kottayam
- Deity: Vishnu

Location
- Location: Midayikunnam, Thalayolaparambu
- State: Kerala
- Country: India
- Coordinates: 9°47′58.7″N 76°27′19.4″E

Architecture
- Type: Architecture of Kerala

Specifications
- Temple: One
- Elevation: 41.65 m (137 ft)

Pundareekapuram Temple is a small Hindu temple atop a little rise called Midayikunnam near Thalayolaparambu in Kottayam. A tiled and saddle roofed square "Chuttambalam" encloses a square sanctum sanctorum. Appended to the square enclosure is a small ‘balikkalpura’. The (main deity) idol is the image of Vishnu.

Other Details
Total Area of Monument	One acre, 95 cents - Sy No.341/7
Owner	Independent Management, Velimankovil Illam, Pundareekapuram Devaswom
Notification No	No.5015/A3/75/HEDN, dt.16.10.75

== See also ==
- Temples of Kerala
