= Keezhoor =

Village in Kottayam District, Kerala

Keezhoor (kee-zh-oor) is a small village located in the Kottayam District in the southern state of Kerala, India. It is within the Mulakulam panchayat and Tehsil Vaikom Thaluk (administrative districts). It is located on the main road connecting the larger towns of Peruva (1½ miles east) and Thalayolaparambu (2½ miles west).

== History ==
The initial settlers probably arrived in Keezhoor in the early-to-mid-19th century. Agriculture has been the major economic activity for the people of Keezhoor. In the past three decades immigration to the Persian Gulf, the US and to the UK by medical and other professionals has changed the face of Keezhoor significantly.This place has an important role in early centuries as 1700'sand 1800's at the time of rural rulers and This place has an historical importance in the past life of vadakkankoor rulers .This place plays a major role in agriculture.

== Schools ==
- Govt. Lower Primary school, Planchuvadu
- St. Joseph CBSE School Planchuvadu, Keezhoor
- St. Joseph UP school, Arunnoottimangalam

== Colleges ==
- DB College Keezhoor, Thalayolapparambu

== Places of worship ==
- Keezhoor Devi Kshetram
- Keezhoor Dharma Shasta Temple
- Mount Carmel Church, Keezhoor
