= Holy Ghost Forane church, Muttuchira =

Ruha d'Qudisha Church, Muttuchira
- Ruha d'Qudisha Syro-Malabar Forane Church
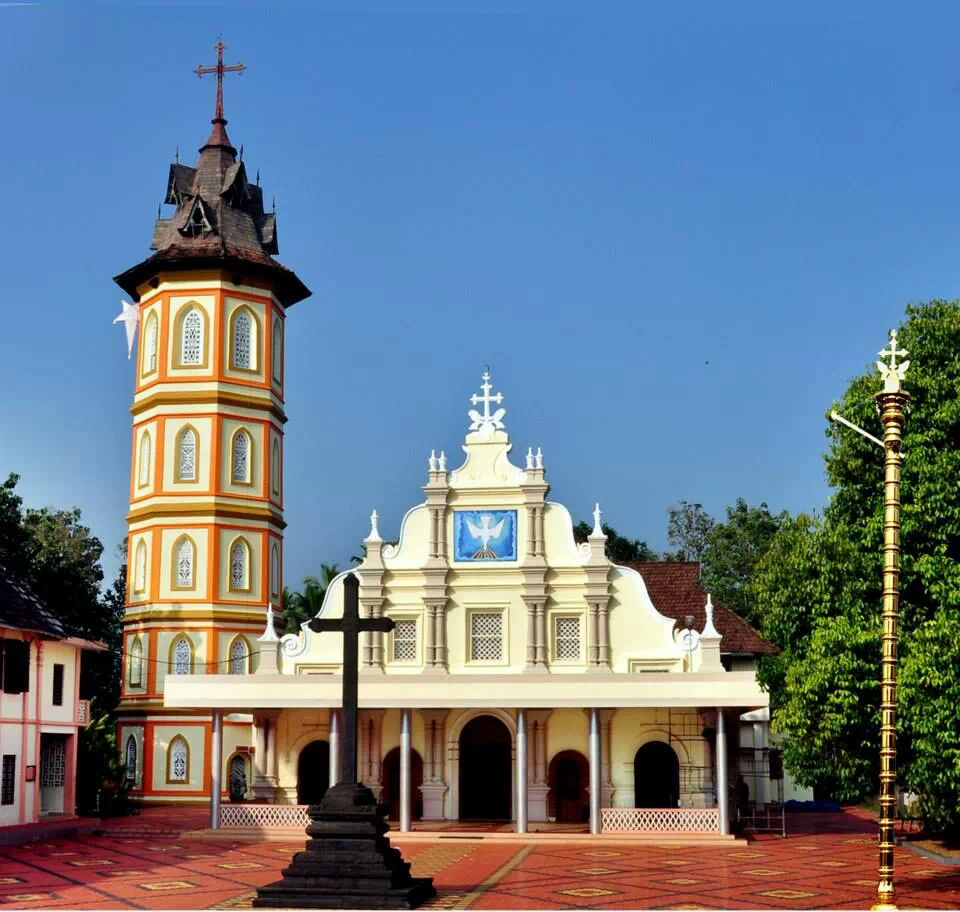
- Location: Muttuchira, Kottayam
- Country: India
- Denomination: Syro-Malabar Church
- Churchmanship: High church
- Website: www.muttuchirachurch.com

History
- Status: Church
- Founded: 510 AD
- Dedication: Ruha d-Qudsha

Architecture
- Functional status: Active

Administration
- District: Kottayam
- Diocese: Pala

Clergy
- Archbishop: Mar Thomas Tharayil (archbishop of Changanassery)
- Bishop: Mar Joseph Kallarangatt
- Vicar: Fr Abraham Kollithanathumalayil

The Holy Ghost Forane Church, or Ruha d Qudisha Church, located at Muttuchira village of Kottayam district, Kerala, India, is believed to be established in the sixth century AD and is one of the ancient churches in Kerala. The church is famous for the presence of ancient granite St Thomas cross, ancient stone writings and ancient mural paintings. The church is under the Syro-Malabar Diocese of Palai.

== History ==
Muttuchira is a village in the Kottayam District situated in the South Indian State of Kerala. It is called as Nayappalli in old records. As per tradition, the Christian settlement of Muttuchira was built up in the sixth century. Antonio Gouvea, the Portuguese voyager who went with Alexis De Menezes, the Archbishop of Goa, recorded the Menezes' visit of Muttuchira in AD 1599. Gouvea used the term Nayapili to mean Muttuchira. The church was called as Spiritu Sancto (Latin for 'Holy Spirit').

Johannes Facundus Raulin in the 1740s in his book Historia Ecclesia Malabaricae uses the term Muttieri. Anquetil Du Perron, a French scholar and Orientalist in January 1758, mentions the Catholic church of the Holy Ghost at Muttiera and mentions of Saint Sebastian.

The Muttuchira church is one of the most ancient churches in India. It is believed to be built up in the sixth century AD. The Christians to this territory were brought by the dependents of the then-landlord Myal Pazhur Naboothiripadu and Mamalassery Kaimal. The local rulers helped the Christian congregation build a new church in the area. The Kallarveli family was a prominent one who helped to build the church. Later, many others came and settled from other places. It was an agricultural area, mainly of ginger and rice paddies. The Muttuchira market also came into existence gradually. Muttuchira had commodity transactions with Kochi at that time. Muttuchira Church was consecrated on Pentecost, 25 May 550 AD. The old main church was at a site called Kurisummoodu near Muttuchira market.

The ancient cross with a granite base standing in Kurisummoodu is adorned with carvings. The main church was with traditional arch-shaped madbaha with a cross and a sacrificial table. As the church members increased in number, the church's space became inadequate and another congregation was established in the seventh century. This new church was built in the site of the present kochupally (little church) inside the compound.

The church was harmed during the assault of the Mukalan rulers in the ninth century AD. The church bells were removed by them. That church was later remodelled and used until the 12th century. It was remodeled again in the 13th century. This church was named after the Holy Ghost. The church had the sanctity behind, verandas on both sides and the spaces for the ministers to keep afloat. Denha thirunal, Epiphany, was important in this church.

An ancient Saint Thomas Christian cross was discovered inside the madbaha wall when the old church at Muttuchira was demolished. This cross is believed to be from the fifth century. The paleontology chief of Travancore Government examined the cross. His assessment is that the cross must be over 1500 years of age. The houses of worship at Maylappur, Kadamattam, Angamali and Kottayam Valiyapally also have such Persian crosses. The St Thomas cross is set near the entryway inside the new Valiyapally (great church) now.

However the verifiable records specify that the stone cross in front of the church was made and presented to the church by Kallarveli Kurisingal Mathai Chacko in the thirteenth century. Muttuchira Church was known as Njayapally. There was no place called Muttuchira back then. The paddy fields close to the church today may have been lakes previously. The name Muttuchira most likely came into existence when the sites were raised with bunds.

The present Valiapally (great church) and the presbytery were built amid the reign of Rev. Fr. Kuriakose Parambil, who was the ward minister here since 1859. This was elevated to a Forane church in 1890. The development of the five-storied chime tower was begun amid the reign of Rev. Fr. Ouseph Chakkalackal, who was the ward cleric in 1901. There are three major bells on the fifth floor. The chime tower has a cross on top of it. The height of the chime tower is 150 feet.

== Ancient mural collections ==
Muttuchira Church has a collection of ancient paintings.

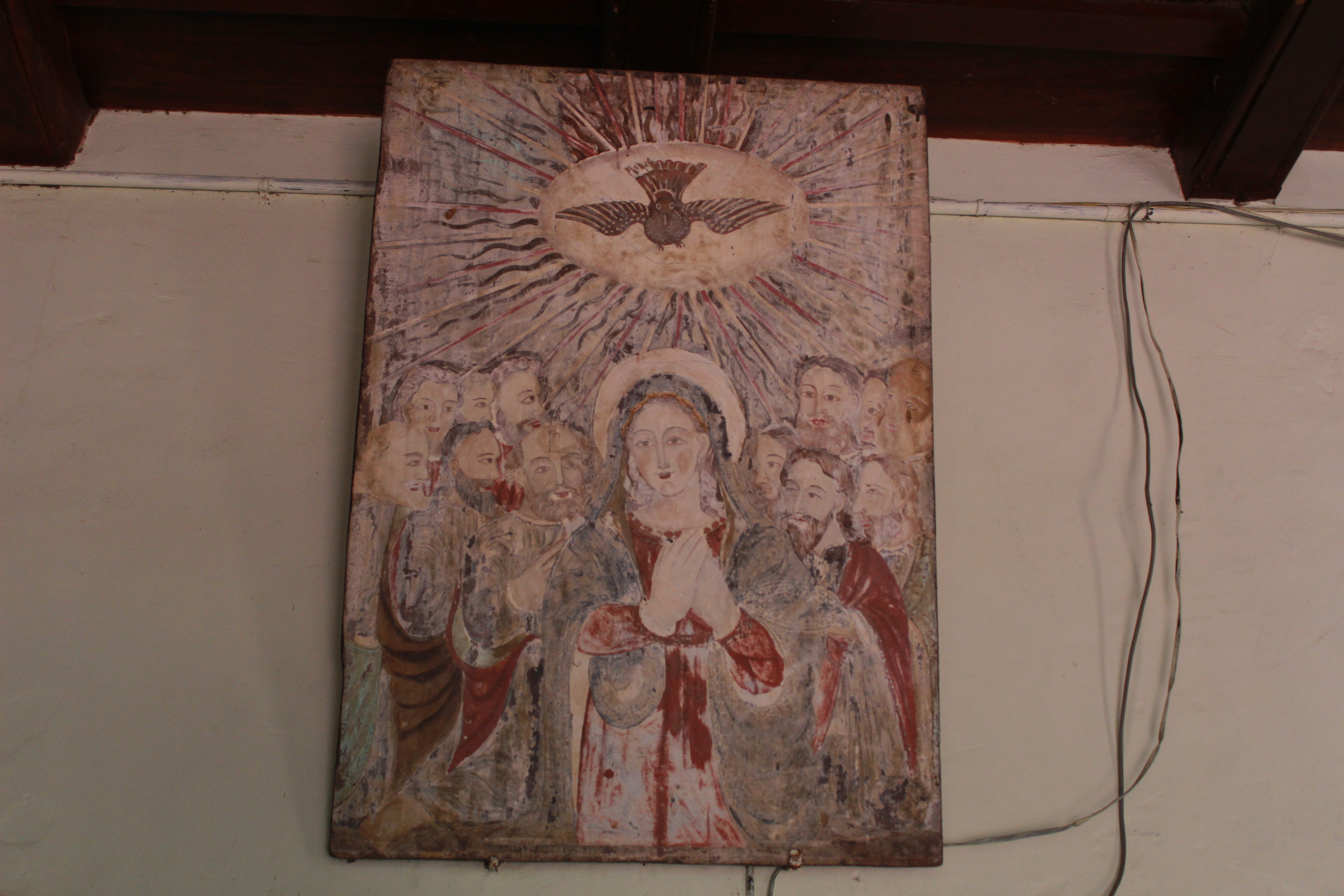
Ancient painting at Muttuchira Church

== Muttuchira stone inscriptions ==
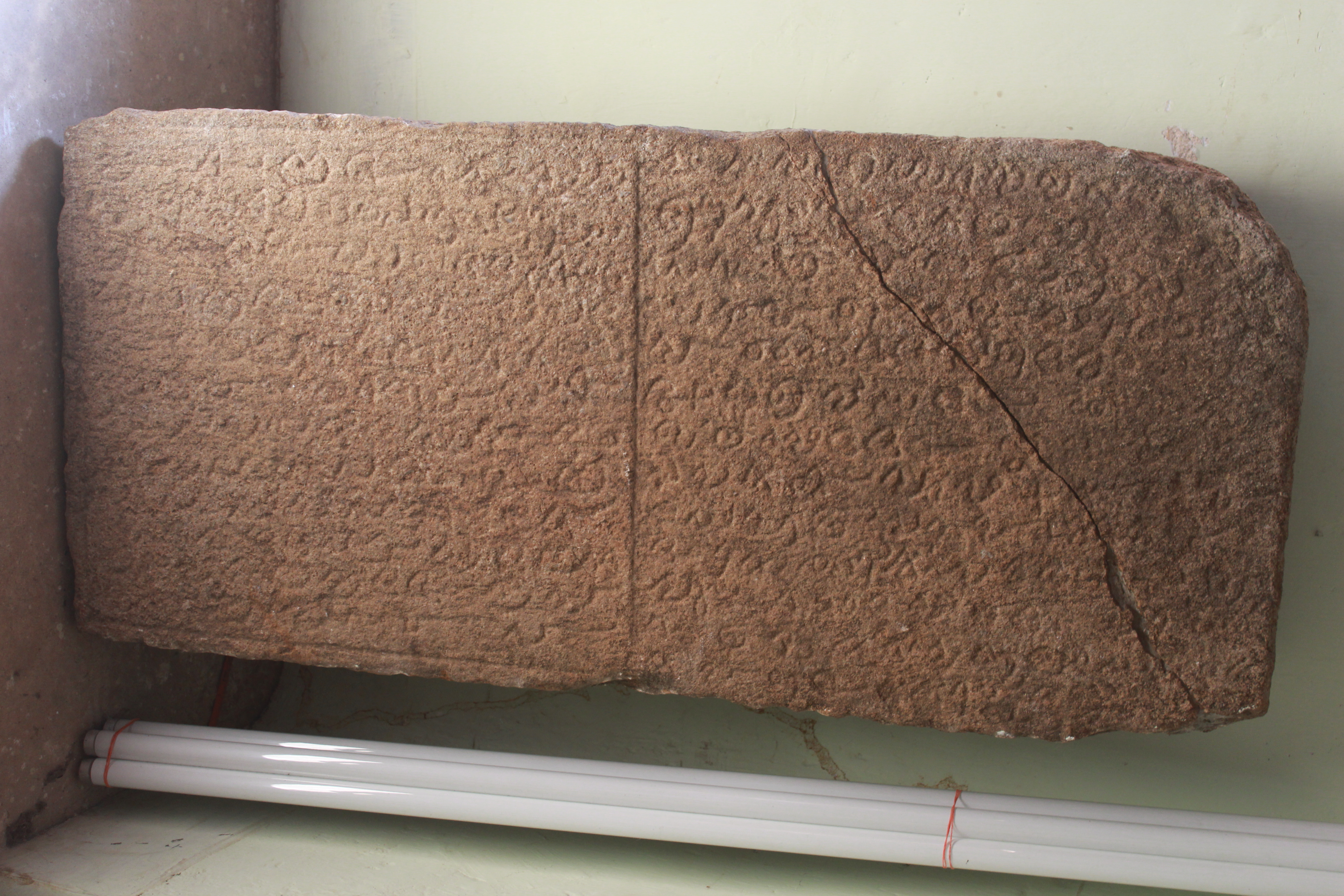
Ancient rock Inscription from Muttuchira Syro Malabar Catholic Church

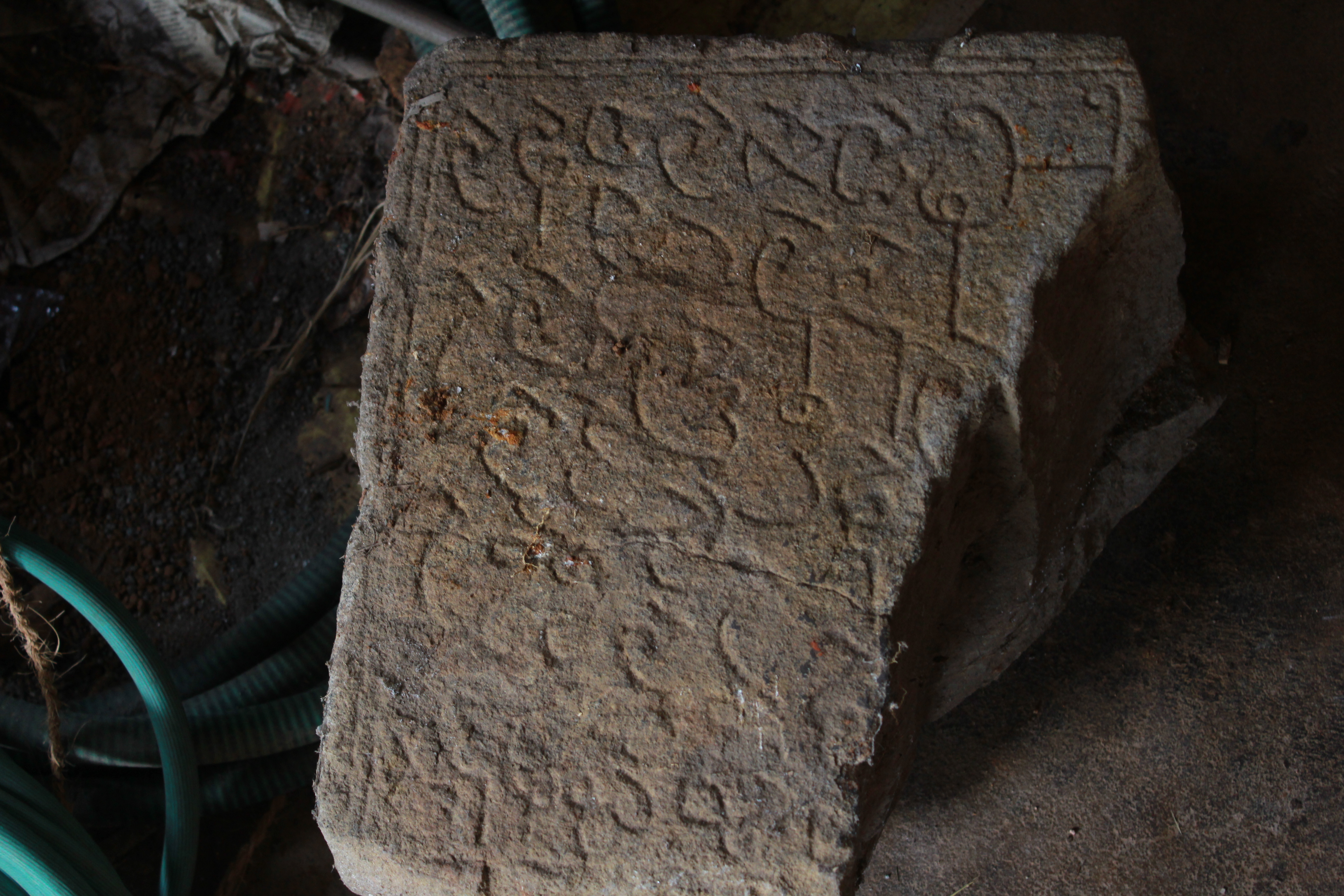
Ancient rock inscription from Muttuchira Syro Malabar Catholic Church

Muttuchira stone engravings are old Malayalam engravings called Vattezhuthu-Nanam Monum. They describe the establishment of the old cross and the Pahlavi recordings are of the Muttuchira Sliba. The engravings are on a rectangular stone piece in two areas partitioned by a vertical line in the middle. As indicated by Mr T K Joseph, this engravings must be from AD 1581 or later. This tablet has been the subject of broad examination by numerous researchers. This rock chunk was found on the western mass of the ground floor room of the two-story building joined toward the northern side of the old Church of the Holy Ghost. The upper story was used as the priest's residence and the ground floor was used as the sacristy.

Following is the English translation of the inscription on the granite plaque:

By the command of the lord in AD 1528 Mar Thana [Mar Denha] and Mar Avu Jacob Abuna] along with Giwargis Padre, installed this Holy Cross in this place. After this, Giwargis padre went to Portugal along with his nephew Mathai padre. In AD 1580, kanni 13 sunday, on the day of the feast of Holy Cross, this mar Sliva was erected covered in wood, by Bishop Mar Simon and Jacob Archdeacon Jacob Padre. Same year, on the day of 18th on the day of the feast, this bleeding Cross was installed. AD 1581 meenam month on the 29th friday good friday, this granite Cross was installed.
