= Mango Meadows =

Agricultural theme park in Kaduthuruthy, Kerala, India

Mango Meadows Agricultural Park
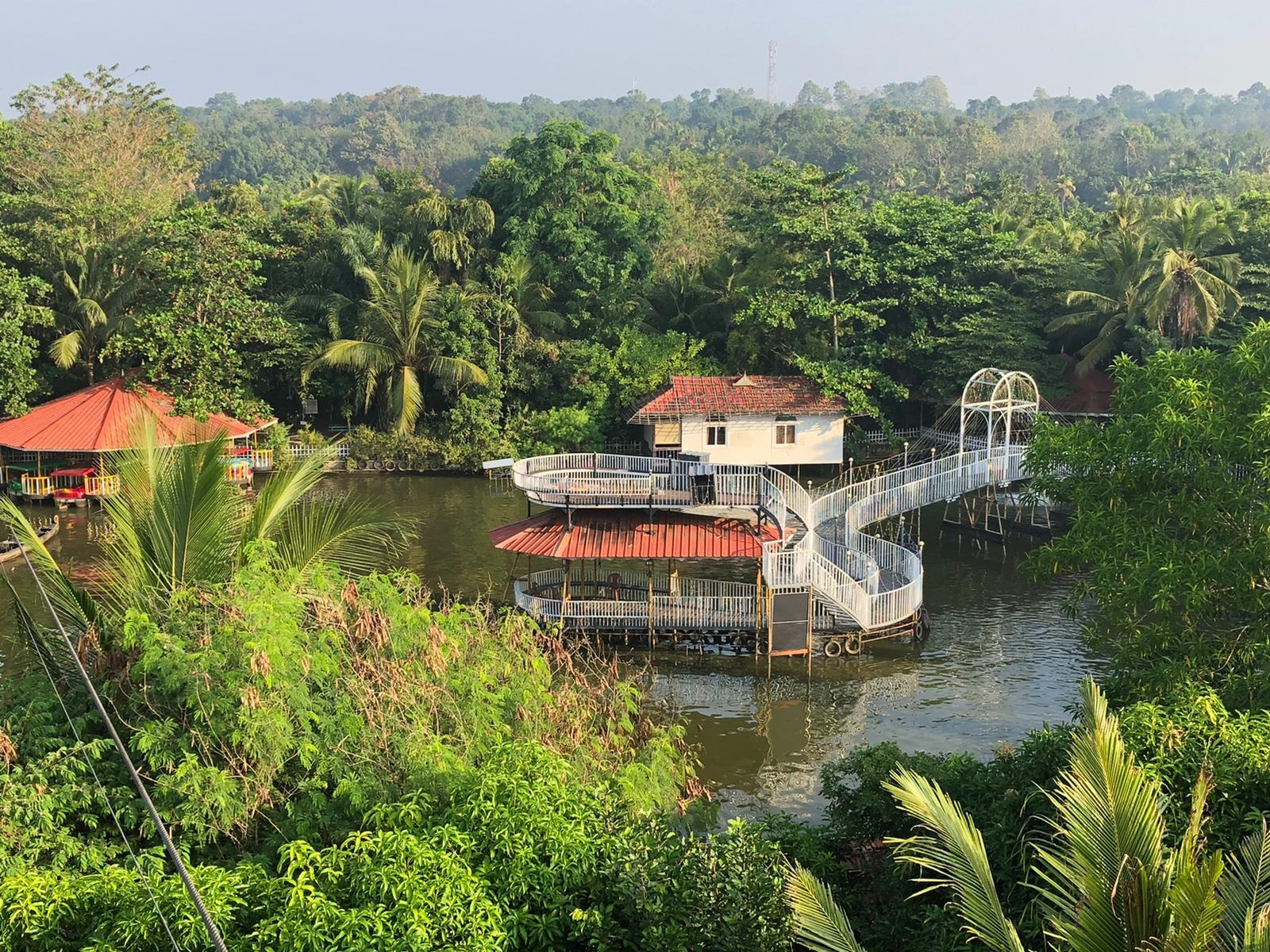
- Meenoottupalam at Mango Meadows

- Location in Kerala, India
- Coordinates: 9.4438°N 76.2817°E
- Country: India
- State: Kerala
- District: Kottayam
- City: Kaduthuruthy
- Opened: 2016
- Founder: N. K. Kurian
- Postal code: 686613
- Website: mangomeadows.in

Mango Meadows is an agricultural theme park in Kaduthuruthy, Kerala, India. With more than 4800 species of plants, including 1900 species of medicinal plants, 700 species of trees, and 900 species of flowering plants, it is one of the most biodiverse places on earth. Rare species like the Ficus alii tree or Ficus maclellandii, Beggar’s bowl or Calabash, Camphor tree or Cinnamomum camphora, Damas tree or Conocarpus lancifolius, Kattupoovarash or Rhododendron arboreum, Rudraksha or Elaeocarpus ganitrus are present in the park.

The main attractions in the park are the Eden Garden, Nakshatra Vriksha junction, valentine garden, domestic animal farm, tea garden, telescope tower, Meenoottu palam and vegetable farm. The park also houses the world's tallest statue of Parashurama, measuring about 35 ft, as well as the biggest Bible statue, with a measurement of 25 ft by 25 ft.

N K Kurian is the founder and visionary behind the Mango Meadows a Gulf-returnee.

== History ==
Work on the park began in 2004 and it was opened to the public in December 2016. The survival of Mango Meadows: Withered then Flourished - A brief History

== Awards and recognition ==
Mango Meadows has found a place in URF World records and Limca Book of Records, for developing the maximum number of plant species in a minimum area of 30 acres. Other awards include UP WORDS Achievers Award 2019, and 'Ente Samrambham' God's Own Brand and Emerging Entrepreneur Awards 2018.

Agriculture entrepreneur N.K. Kurian has been selected for the IARI Innovative Farmer Award 2024, instituted by the Indian Agriculture Research Institute (IARI), for his contribution to agriculture. ICAR-CCARI awarded - IARI Innovative Farmer Award 2024. Universal Records Forum The Director, ICAR-CCARI paid a visit to the Hon'ble Governor of Goa, was accompanied by Shri N. K. Kurian

== The world’s largest Bible Statue ==
Mango Meadows Agriculture Pleasure Land, a biodiversity park in Ayamkudi, a small village in Kaduthuruthy Panchayat in Kottayam district, was developed by N. K. Kurian over 20 years and is billed as the world's first agricultural theme park. It has 85 species of vegetables, 178 fruit trees, 46 varieties of fish and 25 varieties of domestic animals, including cattle, dogs, goats, rabbits and ducks.

Mango Meadows is a place where children, women, old people, differently able, young people and all those who like to know and experience the beauty of nature can enjoy it.

The world’s largest Bible Statue is located at Mango Meadows Agricultural Theme Park, Kaduthuruthy, Kerala, India. The statue of the Bible stands at 25 ft by 25 ft. The statue has been made with concrete and has original pages from the Bible in the Malayalam language. The Bible is presented as open from the center with pages of scriptures visible on both sides. The text is carved on the statue can be easily read. Benches have been provided around the statue where believers can sit and read actual printed form of the Bible while they are literally ‘in the shadow of the Bible’. A Bible Garden containing 125 plants, trees and herbs that were mentioned in the scriptures is set around the statue. The Bible mentions about 125 plants, trees and herbs. Being in the presence of the ‘Biblical Garden’ is believed to provide a spiritual communion and a sense of peace akin to meditation or prayer.

Mango Meadows is a natural man-made reserve that preserves bio-diversity of the plant, herb and tree species endemic to Kerala and those from other regions known for their special properties.

== Activities ==
- Pedal boating
- Kutta Vanchi (basket boating)
- Raw boating
- Swimming pool
- Fishing
- Fish feeding
- Cycling
- Go-kart
- Archery
- Shooting
- Water wheel
- Pottery making
- Shikara boating

== Image gallery ==
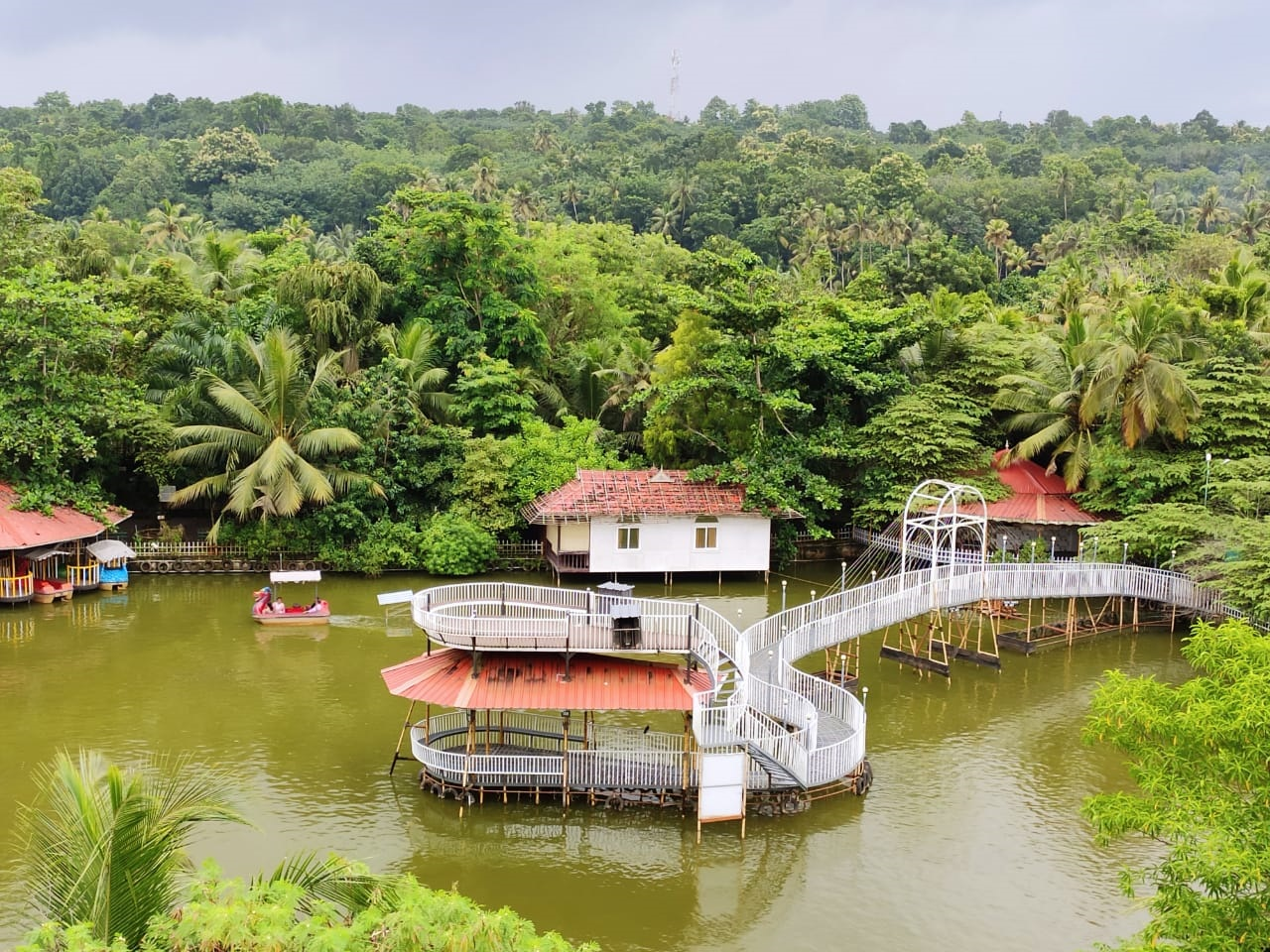
Fish feeding bridge

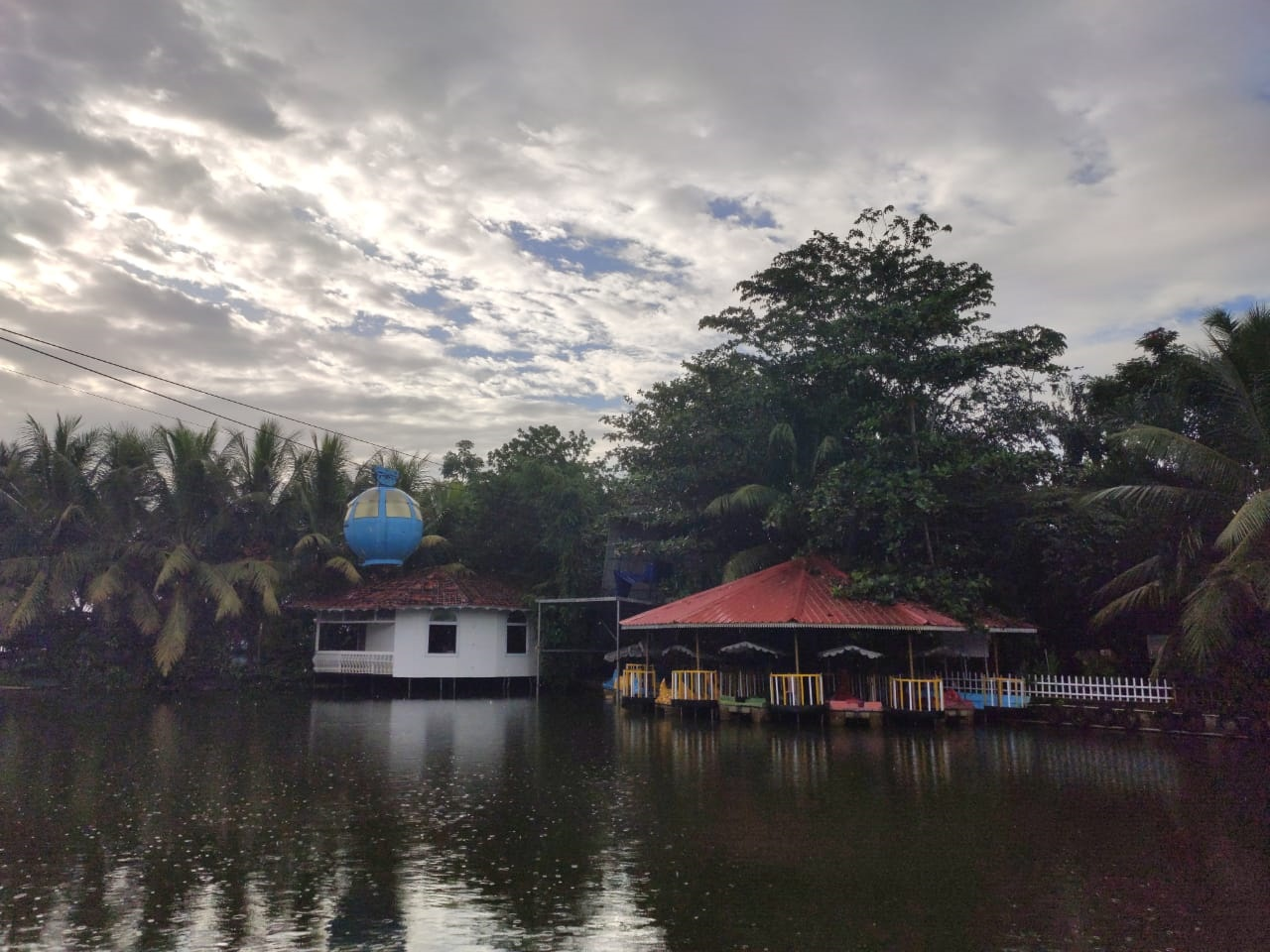
Evening view

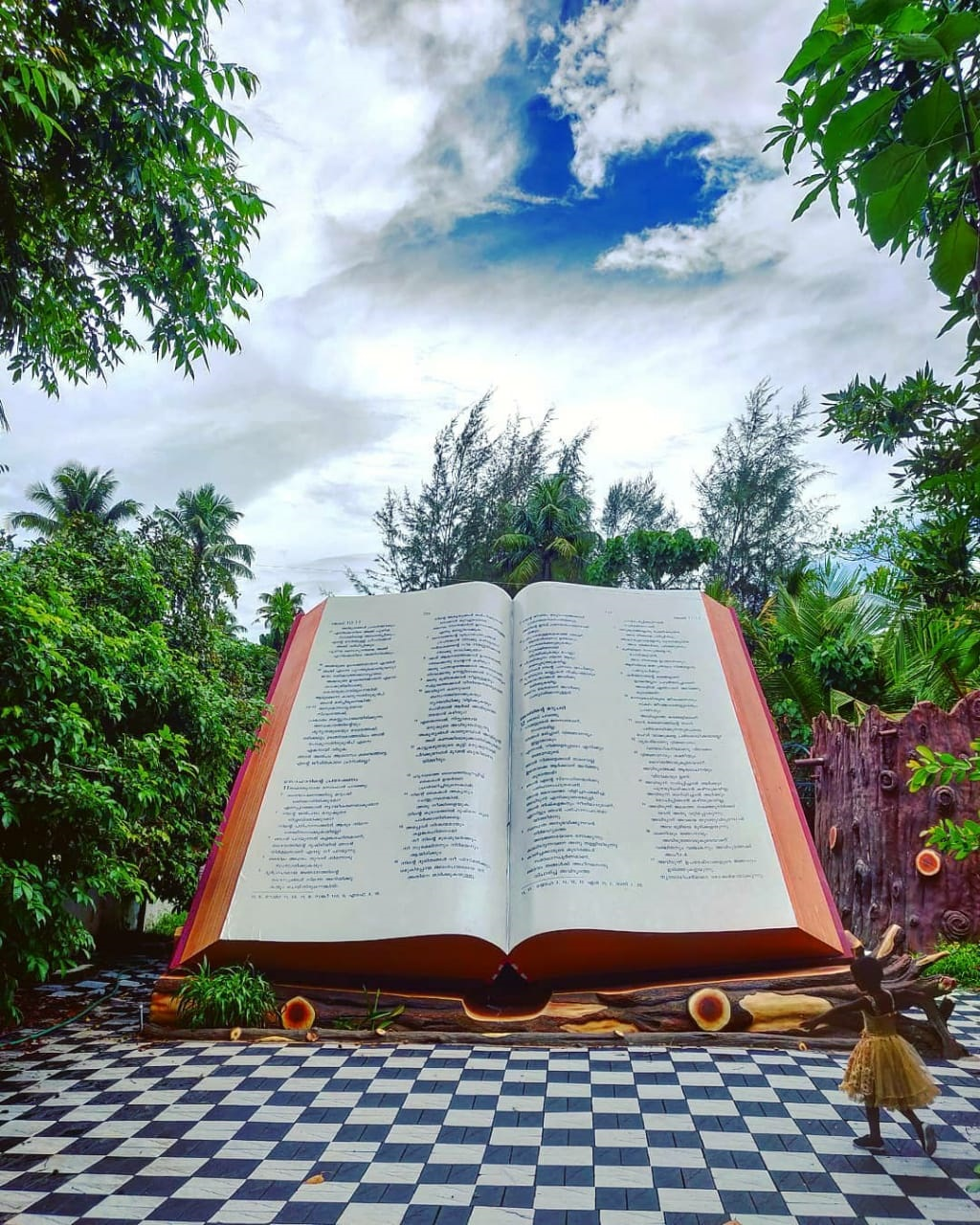
Bible statue at the park

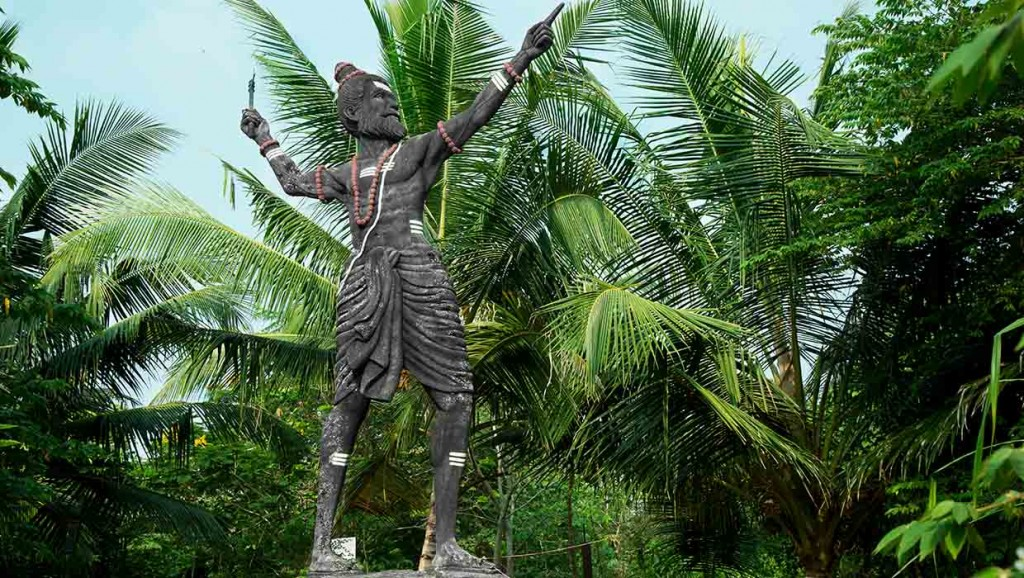
statue of Parashurama
