= N. K. Kurian =

Indian entrepreneur (born 1971)

N.K. Kurian
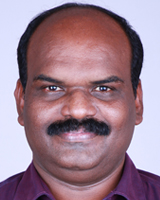
- Born: 12 May 1971 (age 55); Kottayam, Kerala
- Occupations: Founder, Mango Meadows Agricultural Theme Park
- Spouse: Lathika Kurian

Nellikkuzhi Kuriakose Kurian, also known as N K Kurian (born 12 May 1971) is the architect of Mango Meadows Agricultural Theme Park in Kerala, India's first agricultural theme park. and a winner of the Garshom International Awards.

== Early life ==
N K Kurian is a civil engineering diploma holder. He started his career in Saudi Arabia. Later, he moved to Dubai.

== Awards ==
N K Kurian, founder of artificial forest MangoMeadows has found a place in URF World records, honored with the UP WORDS Achievers Award and awarded the Limca Book of Records. Garshom Awards a prestigious award that recognizes the contributions of Non Resident Keralites (NRKs) to the society they live in, their home nation, and Kerala, their motherland. Garshom International Award 2017

Agriculture entrepreneur N.K. Kurian has been selected for the IARI Innovative Farmer Award 2024, instituted by the Indian Agriculture Research Institute (IARI), for his contribution to agriculture. IARI Innovative Farmer Award 2024.

Kurian's Award winning performance was showcased in Universal Records Forum The Director, ICAR-CCARI paid a visit to the Hon'ble Governor of Goa and was accompanied by Shri N. K. Kurian
