= Pothy =

Village in Kottayam District, Kerala, India

Pothy is a small town near Thalayolaparambu, Kottayam district in Kerala, India. It is 2 km from Thalayolaparambu, 10 km from Vaikom, and 35 km from Ernakulam and Kottayam. The Kottayam-Eranakulam railway line passes through Pothy. Mercy Hospital, St. Michael's Church, Little Flower UP and Holy Family LP school, Devaswom Board college, a Maha Vishnu temple, Pattupurackal Devi Temple, and Thrikkarayikkulam Mahadeva Temple are in Pothy.

Sevagram, a rehabilitation centre for orphan children, is also in Pothy.

The population in the 1981 census totalled 3,055 persons living in Pothy (spelled Pothi in the census).
