= Vettikkattumukku =

- Small Town
- Location in Kerala, India
- Coordinates: 9.80426°N 76.45390°E
- Country: India
- State: Kerala
- District: Kottayam
- District panchayat: Kottayam
- Block panchayat: Kaduthuruthy
- Panchayat: Thalayolaparambu
- Talukas: Vaikom

Languages
  - Official: Malayalam, English
- Time zone: UTC+5:30 (IST)
- PIN: 686605
- Telephone code: 04829
- Vehicle registration: KL-36
- Lok Sabha constituency: Kottayam
- Vidhan Sabha constituency: Vaikom

Vettikkattumukku is a small village town in Kottayam District, Kerala. It is part of Thalayolaparambu Panchayat.

== Economy ==
Economy of this region revolves around Muvattupuzha river. Manufacturing construction materials such as solid cement bricks is increasingly becoming a significant economic activity here. Logistics and transportation sector which engages in transporting construction raw materials such as gravel, bricks, sand etc. to western regions such as Alappuzha also is an economic activity. A small part of the population is working in GCC countries.

Agriculture was the major job provider previously. Share of agriculture in the economy is coming down over years.
