= Maravanthuruthu =

- village
- Location in Kerala, India Maravanthuruthu (India)
- Coordinates: 9.794261°N 76.417851°E
- Country: India
- State: Kerala
- District: Kottayam
- District panchayat: Kottayam
- Block panchayat: Vaikom
- Talukas: Vaikom

Government
  - Type: Grama Panchayat
  - Panchayat President: Preethi

Area
  - Total: 15.69 km^{2} (6.06 sq mi)

Population (2001)
  - Total: 20,532
  - Density: 1,309/km^{2} (3,390/sq mi)

Languages
  - Official: Malayalam, English
- Time zone: UTC+5:30 (IST)
- PIN: 686608
- Telephone code: 04829
- Vehicle registration: KL-36
- Sex ratio: 1000 ♂:1036♀
- Literacy: 93% (Men: 97%, Women: 89%)
- Lok Sabha constituency: Kottayam
- Vidhan Sabha constituency: Vaikom
- Number of Wards: 16 (2025 onwards)
- Local Administrative Code: G050103
- Website: lsgkerala.in/maravanthuruthu/

Maravanthuruthu is a small village located in the Kottayam district of Kerala in India. It is surrounded by the river Muvattupuzha and is connected to the neighbouring villages Thalayolaparambu, Enādi by recently constructed bridges. In January 2023, when Kerala was listed by The New York Times in their "52 places to go in 2023" list, Maravanthur got a special mention for its rurality.

It is one of the Grama Panchayats in Vaikom Taluk.
