= Midayikunnam =

Midayikunnam is a small hill near Thalayolaparambu in Kottayam, Kerala, India.
