= Ines G. Županov =

Croatian historian and Indologist

Ines G. Županov (born 1955) is a Croatian historian and Indologist. She is a director of the Centre d’études de l’Inde et de l’Asie du Sud and senior research fellow at the CNRS, Paris.

She is known for her investigation of Christian and Hindu religious interactions in South Asia. In particular, she has researched the Jesuit missions in Portuguese India, their efforts to translate religious texts into local languages and the resultant linguistic and social transformations of the Indians.

== Life ==
Ines G. Županov was born in Zagreb, Yugoslavia, in 1955. She graduated from the University of Zagreb with a degree in comparative literature and Indology in 1979. Her master's (1986) and doctoral degrees (1991) were from the University of California, Berkeley. She is based in Paris, but she has lived successively in Zagreb, Mumbai, Berkeley, Dakar, London, Pondicherry, Berlin, Bochum and currently resides in New Delhi.

== Research ==
=== Evangelism in India ===
Županov has suggested that Portuguese missionaries felt that there was an intrinsic geographical character to India that resisted evangelism and led to paganism. This resistance also contaminated European Christians and caused the meanings of the gospels to be inverted.

She showed that 16th century Jesuit missions in India adopted a calibrated approach to the conversion of Indians to Christianity. Instead of a complete conversion to "European" Christianity, they first translated, with Indian interpreters, key texts into local languages. They abandoned an insistence on proselytising and sermonising in Portuguese, instead encouraging the administration of sacraments in Tamil. This established a society of Indian believers who were then able to organise and fund religious charities and practices, thereby indigenising the faith. Ironically, the translation of Christian works into Tamil by the Jesuits and their interpreters included the rejection of colonial policies. The Jesuits' efforts caused a gradual revolt against the Portuguese language and, eventually, against Portuguese Christian domination.

One of the "accommodative" Jesuit missions was that of Roberto de Nobili, whose evangelism extended deep into the Tamil country. Among his efforts was the attempt to remove the stigmatic name Parangi given by the Tamilians to the Europeans and their converts, a word that originated from farangi (meaning "foreign") but also given to low-caste people for their habit of drinking alcohol. While the Jesuits strove to evangelise on the basis of "kinship, friendship, and locality", they did so by hiding Hindu signs within Christian ones; Nobili went further by pretending that Hindu rites were secular and thus not a religious threat to a converted Christian. However, this caused consternation in the Catholic church's hierarchy in Europe, which feared that the Indian Catholicism was becoming contaminated. Initially, such accommodative practices were approved by the Church, but were outlawed on the basis of sacrilege in 1703.

=== Tamil linguistics ===
Jesuit missionaries began to make close investigations of south Indian languages in the sixteenth century. They determined that Tamil fitted sufficiently into the Latin and Greek linguistic model such that they were able to analyse and teach it using their standard methodology. The Cartilha, published in 1554, compared the syntactic structures of Portuguese and Tamil. The authors found that Tamil was distant enough from the Classical languages that, according to Županov, the Portuguese consigned it and Tamil culture to a "barbarian" (or uncivilised) state, with an impoverished vocabulary. This view has been countered by others, suggesting that "outlandish" or "exotic" might be a better interpretation, as even dialectical differences from the standard were often called "barbarous".

By 1717, however, the Protestant evangelist and linguist Bartholomäus Ziegenbalg was to claim Tamil was peculiar, in the sense of distinctive, because its grammatical conjugation and declension was regular, and in terms of vocabulary, on par with Latin. This corresponds to Županov's assessment of another Jesuit, Henrique Henriques, who had compiled a Tamil grammar Arte da Lingua Malabar in 1549.

== Books ==
- Ines G. Županov; Ângela Barreto Xavier (2015). Catholic Orientalism – Portuguese Empire, Indian Knowledge (16th-18th c.). New Delhi: Oxford University. ISBN 9780199452675.
- Ines G. Županov (2005). Missionary Tropics – The Catholic Frontier in India (16th-17th centuries). Ann Arbor: University of Michigan. ISBN 9780472114900.
- Ines G. Županov (1999). Disputed Mission – Jesuit Experiments and Brahmanical Knowledge in Seventeenth-Century India. New Delhi: Oxford University. ISBN 9780195650532.
- Stephen Greenblatt, Ines G. Županov, Reinhardt Meyer-Kalkus, Pal Nyiri, Frederike Pannewick, Heike Paul (2009), Cultural Mobility, A Manifesto, Cambridge: Cambridge University Press. ISBN 978-0521682206
- Hélène Vu-Thanh and Ines G. Županov, eds. (2021) Trade and Finance in Global Missions (16th-18th centuries). Leiden: Brill. ISBN 9789004444171
- Ines G. Županov, ed. (2019) Oxford Handbook of the Jesuits, editor, New York: Oxford University Press. ISBN 9780190639631
- Ines G. Županov and Pierre-Antoine Fabre, eds. (2018) The Rites Controversies in the Early Modern World. Leiden: Brill. ISBN 9789004360068
- Jorge Flores, Corinne Lefèvre and Ines G. Županov, eds. (2015) Cosmopolitisme en Asie du Sud; Sources, Itinéraires, Langues. Puruṣārtha 33, Paris : CEIAS/EHESS. ISBN 978-2713224928
- Anand Amaladass and Ines G. Županov, eds. (2014) Intercultural Encounter and the Jesuit Mission in South Asia (16h-18th Centuries). Bangalore: Asian Trading Corporation. ISBN 9788170866909
- Marie Fourcade and Ines G. Županov, eds. (2013) L’Inde des Lumières; Discours, histoire, savoirs (XVI-XIXe s.)/ Indian Enlightenment: Between Orientalism and Social Sciences(XVII-XIX siècle ), Puruṣārtha. Paris: EHESS. ISBN 9782713223778
- Corinne Lefèvre and Ines G. Županov, eds. (2012) Cultural Dialogue in South Asia and Beyond: Narratives, Images and Community (16th-19th centuries), JESHO 55. Leiden.
- Ch. de Castelnau, A. Maldavsky, M.L. Copete and Ines G. Županov, eds. (2011) Circulation des savoirs et missions d’évangélisation (XVIe-XVIIIe siècles). Madrid : Casa de Velásquez/ EHESS. ISBN 9788490962466
- Ines G. Županov and Caterina Guenzi, eds. (2008) Divins remèdes; Médecine et religion en Asie du Sud. Puruṣārtha, Paris : CEIAS/EHESS. ISBN 978-2713221675

== Bibliography ==
- Aranha, Paolo (2010). ""Glocal" conflicts: Missionary controversies on the Coromandel Coast between the XVII and XVIII centuries". In Michela Catto; Guido Mongini; Silvia Mostaccio (eds.). Evangelizzazione e Globalizzazione: Le missioni gesuitiche nellétà moderna tra storia e storiografia. Humanities Commons. pp. 79–104. doi:10.17613/M68P75. ISBN 978-88-534-3423-4.
- James, Gregory (2010). "The 'classical' construction of Tamil morphology in the eyes of the earliest European missionary grammarians". Academia.
- Mills, Kenneth; Grafton, Anthony (2003). Conversion: Old Worlds and New. University of Rochester. ISBN 978-1-58046-123-8.
- Pillai, Shanthini (2017). "Modern Asian ecclesiastical interconnections: Catholic Tamil Nadu and its diaspora in Malaysia". The Australian Journal of Anthropology. 28 (2): 165–179. doi:10.1111/taja.12232.
