= Muttuchira =

- village
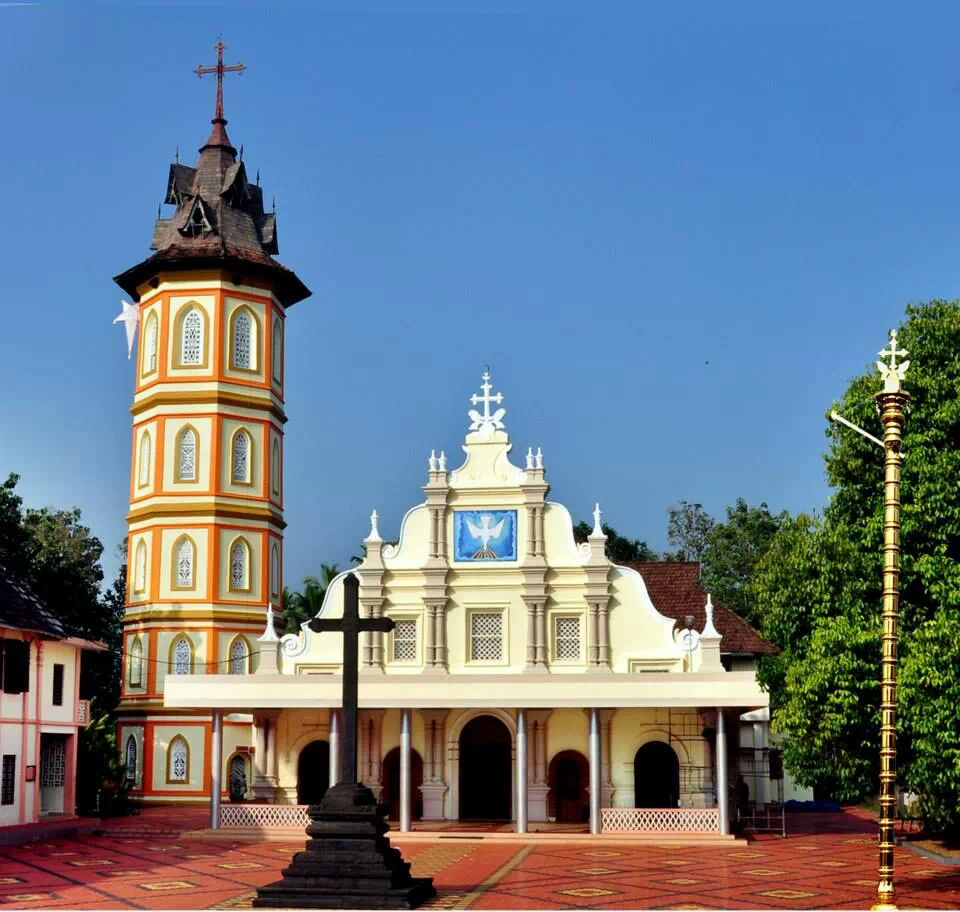
- Muttuchira Church
- Nickname: Muttuch
- Location in Kerala, India Muttuchira (India)
- Coordinates: 9°45′20″N 76°30′0″E
- Country: India
- State: Kerala
- District: Kottayam

Population (2011)
  - Total: 15,962

Languages
  - Official: Malayalam, English
- Time zone: UTC+5:30 (IST)
- PIN: 686613
- Vehicle registration: KL-36

Muttuchira is a village in Kottayam district in the state of Kerala, India.

== Demographics ==
As of the 2011 India census, Muttuchira had a population of 15,962 with 7,864 males and 8,098 females. It is a quiet farming village with rubber plantations, coconut plantations, and paddy fields. The landscape is hilly and narrow and is inhabited by Christians and Hindus. Most people are employed in either the farming or service sector.

In ancient records, Muttuchira was recorded as Nayappilli. Muttuchira got its name from a small check dam (chira) constructed in earlier times to irrigate paddy fields. It currently has a hospital (Muttuchira Holy Ghost Mission Hospital), a bank, an ATM, a Village Office, a post office, multiple churches (Holy Ghost Church), Temples (Kunnasheri Kave, Trikke), a Government Polytechnic, a nursing school, a girls high school, boys high school, LP & UP schools, Government Ayurveda dispensary and market. Kaduthuruthy Railway Halt is in the village. The village is part of Kaduthuruthy Gram Panchayat and Kaduthuruthy Assembly constituency. Saint Alphonsa of India was brought up in this village. The majority population are Syro-Malabar Catholics and some protestant Christians, but many Hindus also live in Muttuchira harmoniously.

== Holy Ghost Forane church, Muttuchira ==
Holy Ghost Forane church, Muttuchira is one of the oldest churches in India. There is an ancient Pahlavi inscribed granite bas-relief cross found in Muttuchira. According to the local tradition, the Church at Muttuchira was founded in AD 510. It was probably located near the ancient open air rock cross at Kurisum-moodu, a little east of the present church dedicated to Mar Sleeba (syriac:sliba meaning Holy Cross). It is probable that a new Church was built in the present Church compound on the Eastern side in AD 1528 by Mar Denha and Mar Abo ( Mar Jacob Abuna) as narrated on the Muttuchita inscriptions. This Church was dedicated to Ruha D Kudisha- Holy Spirit. The Pahlavi inscribed granite Cross was transferred to this Church from the ancient Mar Sliba Church. Later, this sliba which was placed in the altar was covered by building a wooden raredos rathaal in front of it. In AD 1854-58 period, another Church was built in front the old Church dedicated to Ruha D Kudisha which is the main Church at Muttuchira today. In AD 1923, the old Rooha D Kudhisha Syro-Malabar Catholic Forane Church, Muttuchira on the eastern side of the present Church was renovated to rededicate it to Saint Francis of Assisi. During the renovations, the ancient Pahlavi inscribed Granite Sliva was rediscovered behind the wooden raredos-rathaal of the old church fixed to the eastern wall of the Madbaha. It was again neglected and transferred to the new Ruha D' Qudisha Church in a very unimportant place- back side of the wall of the facade in a corner, probably because of the interests of the Archaeological Department of the then Government of Travancore. Now, this invaluable monument of Saint Thomas Christians of Malabar has been placed in a side altar of the main Church.

== Muttuchira inscriptions ==
Muttuchira inscriptions are early Malayalam inscriptions- Vattezhuthu- Nanam Monum- on a granite tablet found in Muttuchira. The 'Muttuchira inscriptions' are inscriptions narrating about the installation of the free standing Cross and the Pahlavi inscribed bas relief cross, The 'Muttuchira Sliba'. The inscriptions are on a rectangular granite slab in two sections divided by a vertical line in between. According to Mr. T. K. Joseph, this inscription must be of AD 1581 or later. This tablet has been the subject of extensive research by many scholars. This granite slab was found on the western wall of the ground floor room of the two storey building attached to the northern side of the old Church of the Holy Ghost. The upper story was used as the Priest's Home and the ground floor was used as the sacristy. Muttuchira Sliba, the Pahlavi inscribed Cross is an invaluable monument of the Christian community that was the symbol of veneration of the ancient Christian settlement of Muttuchira. Muttuchira inscription tablet is another landmark monument which narrates installation of the Mar Thoma Sliva in the altar and the open air Rock Cross of Muttuchira Church is historically important.

== Alexander de Campo ==
Palliveettil Chandy Metran belonged to the Palliveetti family at Muttuchira. He was Vicar of Kuravilangad Parish and later had Kuravilangad as his headquarters. He was a native of the Muttuchira parish, in the present central Kerala. As a priest his original name was Palliveettil Chandy Cathanar. He was consecrated Titular Bishop of Megara in Achala and Vicar Apostolic and Administrator of the Archbishopric of Cranganore on 31 January 1663, at Kaduthuruthy. He celebrated his first pontifical mass at Muttuchira church. Portuguese Bishop appointed Palliveettil Chandy Cathanar as the Bishop Alexander de Campo for the Catholic St. Thomas Christians on 1 February 1663 thus, they kept their Syro Chaldean rite of worship. Palliveettil Mar Chandy used the historic title 'The Metropolitan and the Gate of all India'. This title denotes a Quasi Patriarchal status with all India jurisdiction.

== Archdeacon Jacob ==
Archdeacon Jacob of Muttuchira was a native of Muttuchira and was based in this church until his death. He was buried in the Church of Saint Francis of Assisi. He was appointed as Archdeacon by Mar Simon, the Chaldean Bishop who arrived in Malabar in 1576 AD during the time of Mar Abraham, as a rival. Mar Simon was sent to Rome but Archdeacon Jacob had followers until his death in 1596.

== Saint Alphonsa ==
Saint Alphonsa of India spent her early years in Muttuchira parish. Saint Alphonsa was brought up in her aunt's house, the Muricken family of Muttuchira due to her mother's death upon her birth.
