= Kothanalloor =

Kothanalloor Mudappa
- Village
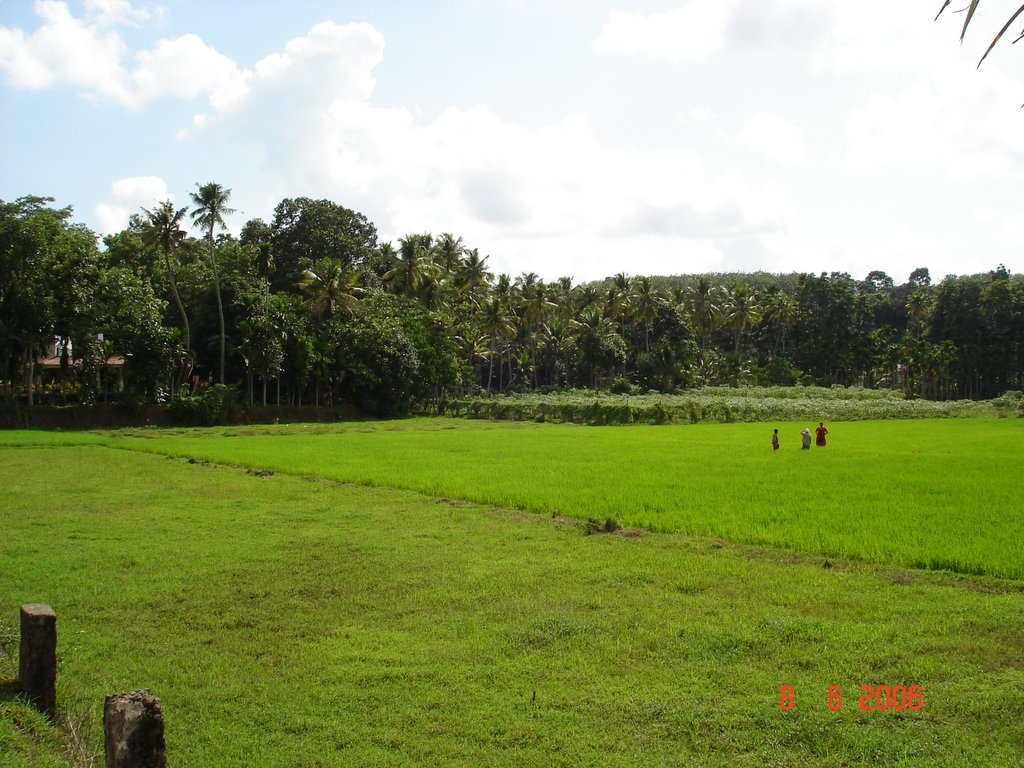
- A paddy field in Kothanalloor village

- Location in Kerala, India Kothanalloor (India)
- Coordinates: 9.720092°N 76.523691°E
- Country: India
- State: Kerala
- District: Kottayam

Languages
  - Official: Malayalam, English
- Time zone: UTC+5:30 (IST)
- PIN: 686632
- Telephone code: 914829/04829
- Vehicle registration: KL-5/KL-36
- Nearest city: Mudappa
- Lok Sabha constituency: Kottayam
- Climate: Tropical (Köppen)

Kothanalloor is a village located in Vaikom Taluk of Kottayam District of Kerala, India. It is situated on the Kottayam-Ernakulam (Cochin) highway, 17.5 kilometers from Kottayam and 49.1 kilometers from Ernakulam. The nearest railway station is at Kuruppanthara, which is 3.9 kilometers away.

== History ==
Kothanalloor is mentioned in Unnineeli sandhesham (14th century AD) and annals of Synod of Diamper (AD 1599).

== Religion ==
Hinduism and Christianity are both practiced in Kothanalloor.But Christianity is the prominent religion in Kothanalloor village.The main places of worship are the Devi Temple (Vana Durga Devi), Mar Sapor and Mar Proth Forane Catholic Church and St.Mary's Knanaya Catholic Church. Kothanalloor is now widely known to foreign lands in the name of "Twins Meet" conducted on 18 June every year by St.Gervasis and St.Prothasis Forane Church in connection with the feast of 'Kandesangal', the twin saints.Twins belonging to all religions in Kerala are participating in the Twins Meet

Mar Sabor and Mar Proth Forane Church, now known as St.Gervasis & Prothasis Church is one of the most ancient churches in India, established in 826AD.

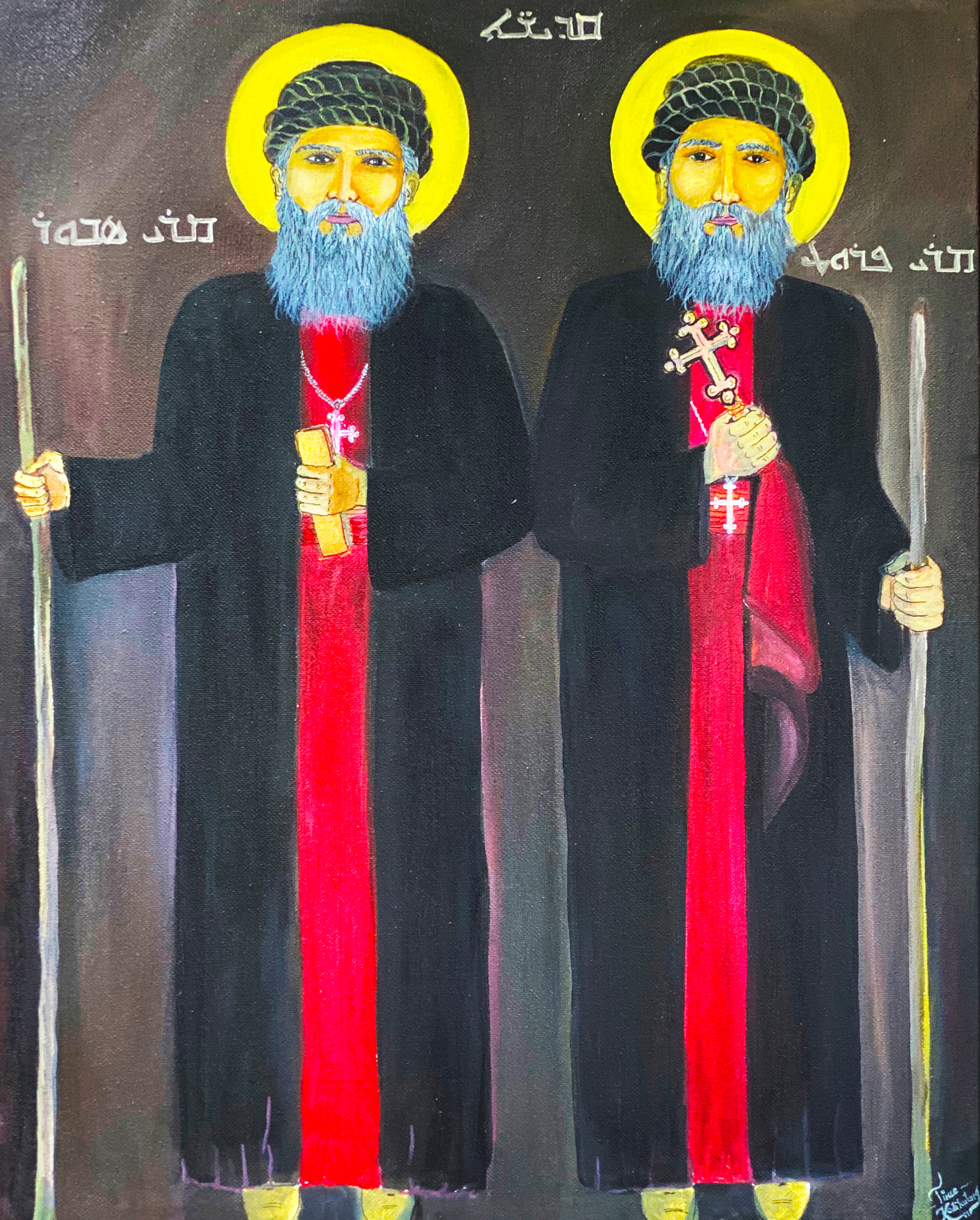
Mar Sabor and Mar Proth the protectors of Kothanalloor

== Education ==
Emmanuel's Higher School Kothanalloor began as the 'Mudappa Vernacular (Secondary) School' in 1919 under the management of St.Gervasis and Prothasis Forane Church which is earlier called as Mar Sapor and Mar Proth Church. It has more than 2500 students and 100 employees.
