= Kaduthuruthy =

Kaduthuruthy Kaduthuruthi, Kaduturutti
- Town
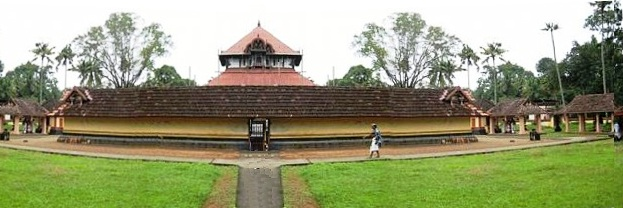

- Location in Kerala, India Kaduthuruthy (India)
- Coordinates: 9.75°N 76.50°E
- Country: India
- State: Kerala
- District: Kottayam

Government
  - Body: Kaduthuruthy Grama Panchayat

Area
  - Total: 18.62 km^{2} (7.19 sq mi)
- Elevation: 12 m (39 ft)

Population (2011)
  - Total: 19,352
  - Density: 1,039/km^{2} (2,692/sq mi)

Languages
  - Official: Malayalam, English
- Time zone: UTC+5:30 (IST)
- Vehicle registration: KL-36, KL-67

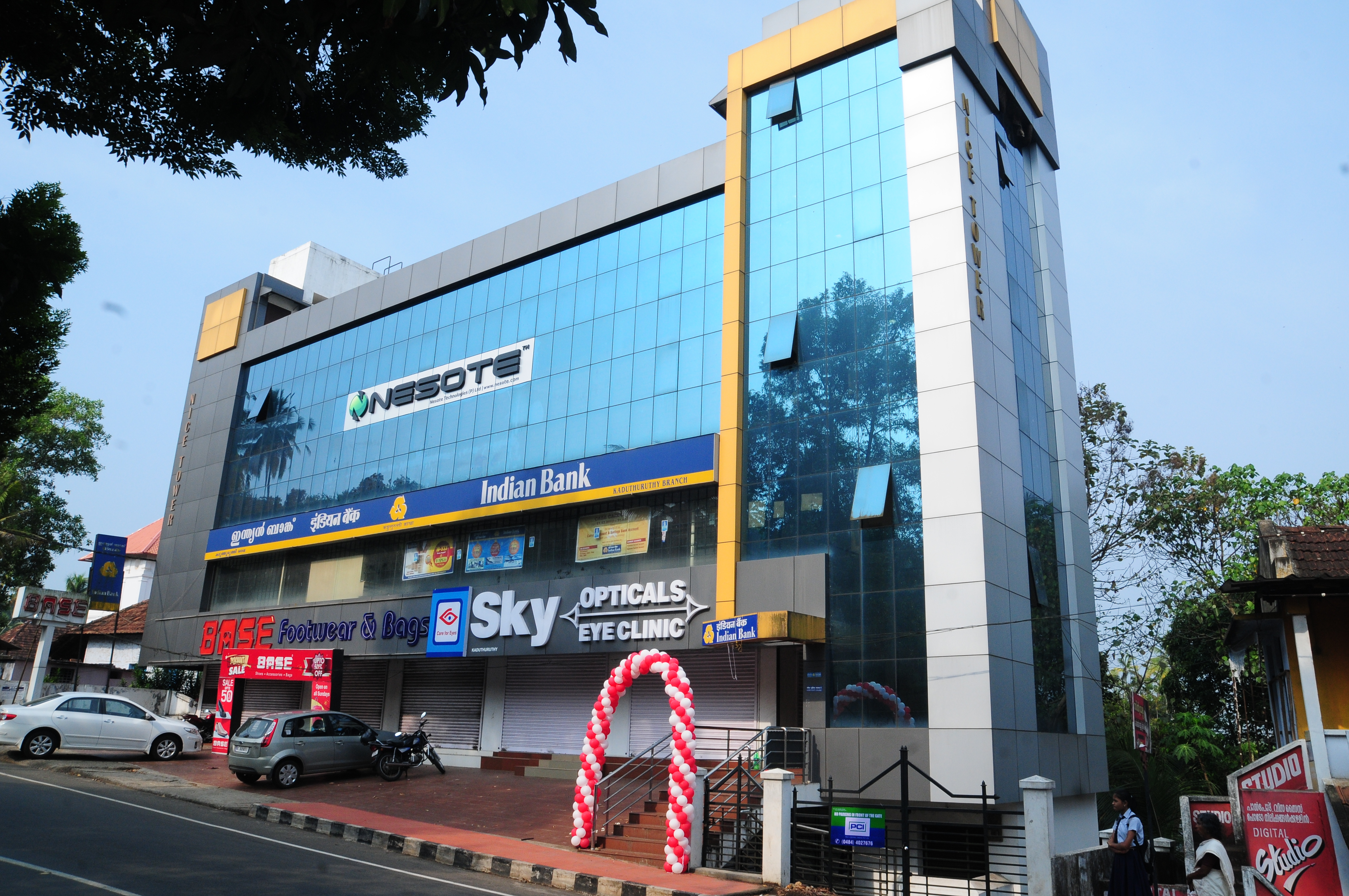
Nesote Building

Kaduthuruthy is a revenue village and grama panchayat in Kottayam district in the state of Kerala, India. It is also headquarters of the Kaduthuruthy block panchayat. It is the site of the Kaduthuruthy Valiya Palli church.

Kaduthuruthy assembly constituency is part of the Kottayam Lok Sabha constituency. Monce Joseph represents Kaduthuruthy in the Kerala Legislative Assembly.

== Tourism ==
Mango Meadows is an agricultural theme park located in Kaduthuruthy, Kottayam district, Kerala. Described by the Kaduthuruthy Grama Panchayat and Kerala Tourism as the world's first agricultural theme park, it is spread across approximately 30 acres and features a diverse collection of more than 4,500 species of plants and trees, including rare and medicinal varieties. The park combines agriculture, biodiversity conservation and eco-tourism, with organic farming, fruit and vegetable cultivation, a plant nursery and opportunities to learn about traditional farming practices. Its attractions include landscaped gardens, ponds, a bird sanctuary, a domestic animal farm and nature trails. Visitors can also enjoy recreational activities such as boating, cycling, fishing and fish feeding, as well as nature-oriented accommodation facilities.
