= Education in Kottayam district =

Kottayam district is a centre of education in Kerala state. The Orthodox Theological Seminary (Orthodox Pazhaya Seminary) at Chungam was the first institution to teach English in South India. It was founded in 1815 by Colonel John Monroe. The C.M.S High School (which later became the Church Missionary Society College High School) was founded by the British missionary, Benjamin Bailey. The first college in Kerala state and the second established under British rule in India was the C.M.S. College (Grammar School) (1840). Mahatma Gandhi University is located in Kottayam district. Later, the clergies of Catholic Church, after seeing a need for an English high school for students of Central Travancore, established a residential high school St Berchmans English High School in 1891 in Changanasserry under the leadership of Fr Charles Lavigne, then vicariate apostolate of Kottayam. Even though it was started as a school for seminarians, it became public soon itself. In 1922, Venerable Mar Thomas Kurialacherry founded the famous SB College Changanassery for both intermediate students and scholars in Central Travancore. Today, both CMS College and SB College are recognised, for their legacy, as reputed and noted institutions of Kerala.

== Educational Institutions ==
Kottayam district has 478 lower primary schools, 208 upper primary schools and 258 high schools. There are also 24 arts and science colleges, four Training colleges, three co-operative colleges, seven teachers training institutes, two industrial training institutes, and many engineering colleges. Educational institutions located in Kottayam district include:

- Indian Institute of Information Technology, Kottayam
- Indian Institute of Mass Communication, Kottayam
- Mahatma Gandhi University, Kottayam
- CMS College, Kottayam
- SB College, Changanasserry
- Government Medical College, Kottayam, Gandhinagar
- Government Dental College, Kottayam,(Gandhinagar)
- Rajiv Gandhi Institute of Technology, Kottayam (Government Engineering College), Pampady
- Government College, Kottayam
- Baselius College
- B.C.M College, Kottayam
- KG College Pampady
- Kuriakose Elias College, Mannanam
- Theophilus College of Nursing, Kangazha (private sector)
- Mar Thoma Seminary Higher Secondary School, Zion Hill, Kottayam.
- Kottayam Technical Higher Secondary School and College of Applied Science, IHRD, Puthuppally
- St Joseph College of Communication

== Other arts and science colleges ==
- St. Xavier's College, Vaikom
- Baker Women's College, Kottayam
- Bishop Kurialacherry College, Amalagiri
- S.N. College, Kumarakom
- St. Mary's College, Manarcad
- Ettumanoorappan College, Ettumanoor
- St. Thomas College, Pala
- Alphonsa College, Pala
- Sree Sabareesa College, Mundakayam
- St. Dominics College, Kanjirappally
- St. George College, Aruvithura
- MES College, Erattupetta
- NSS Hindu College, Changanasserry
- St. Stephen's College, Uzhavoor
- P. G. R. Memorial S N Arts and Science College, Channanikkadu
- Gurudeva Institute of Science and Technology, Puthuppally
- B.K. College, Amalagiri
- S.V.R.N.S.S. College, (Kodungoor) Vazhoor
- PGM College, Devagiri, Kangazha
- PRDS College of Arts and Sciences, Changanassery
- Devamatha College, Kuravilangad
- College Of Applied Science, Payyappady, Puthuppally
- Shermount College of Arts and Commerce, Erumely
- MES College, Erumely
- Labour India College, Marangaattupally
- Bishop Speechly college, Pallom

== Engineering colleges ==
- Rajiv Gandhi Institute of Technology, Kottayam
- Indian Institute of Information Technology, Kottayam (2015)

== Private sector Engineering colleges ==
- St. Joseph's College of Engineering & Technology, Pala
- Amal Jyothi College of Engineering, Kanjirappally
- Mangalam College of Engineering
- Saintgits College of Engineering, Pathamuttom
- Kottayam Institute of Technology and Science, Pampady
- College of Engineering, Poonjar
- Mar Augusthinose College, Ramapuram.
- D.B. College, Keezhoor.
- K.G. College, Pampady
- Ettumanoorappan College, Ettumanoor.
- B.V.M. College, Pala
- St. Dominic's College, Kanjirapally
- K.E. College, Mannanam
- Mangalam College of Engineering, Ettumanoor
- Henry Baker College, Melukavu

== Institutes of media studies ==
- Indian Institute of Mass Communication, Kottayam
- KR Narayanan National Institute of Visual Science and Arts
- Manorama School of Communication
- Creative Hut Institute of Photography, Mattakkara
- St Joseph College Of Communication, Changanassery

== Polytechnic colleges ==
- Government Polytechnic College, Kottayam
- Model Polytechnic College, Mattakkara
- Government Polytechnic college, Pala

== Other organizations ==
Other institutes include

- Tropical Institute of Ecological Sciences (TIES), a research center affiliated with the Mahatma Gandhi University for Environmental Sciences
- Centre for Rural Management (CRM)
- Central Research Institute for Homoeopathy
- Sreenivasa Ramanujam Institute of Basic Sciences
- KR Narayanan National Institute of Visual Science and Arts
- Rubber Research Institute of India (RRI).
- NSS Training College, Changanacherry

== Schools ==
- Marian Senior Secondary School, Kalathipady, Kottayam
- Holy Family International School, Elangoi, Chamampathal
- Joseph's Public School and Junior College, Kunnumbhagam, Kanjirappally
- Lourdes Public School and Junior College
- Sree Kumaramangalam Public School, Kumarakom
- Sree Kumaramangalam Higher Secondary School, Kumarakom
- St. Shantals High School, Mammood, Changanacherry
- Al Manar School, Erattupetta
- St. Joseph's Convent Girls Higher Secondary School, Kottayam
- St. Anne's Girls Higher Secondary School, Kottayam
- Lisieux English Senior Secondary School, Vaikom
- Amala Public School, Moothedathukavu, Vaikom
- Government Higher Secondary School, Panamattom
- Baker Memorial Girls High School in Kottayam (1820)
- M.T. Seminary Higher Secondary School, Kottayam
- St. Joseph's High School, Kudakkachira
- Kendriya Vidyalaya, Kottayam Kendriya Vidyalaya, Rubber Board, Kottayam
- Alphonsa Residential School, Bharananganam, Palai
- AKJM School, Kanjirappally, Kottayam
- CMS LP School Arpookara
- Jawahar Navodaya Vidyalaya, Kottayam
- M.D. Seminary School, Kottayam
- N.S.S. College Perunna, Changanacherry
- N.S.S. H.S.S. Anickadu
- Holy Family High School, Parampuzha Baselius College, Kottayam
- Bappuji Central School, Peruva
- Mangalam EMRHSS, Ettumanoor
- Depaul English Medium and Public H.S.S. school, Kuravilangadu
- Emmanuel's HSS, Kothanalloor
- P Geevarghese School of Nursing, Devagiri, Kangazha, Kottayam.
- School of Laboratory Technology MGDM Hospital, Devagiri, Kangazha, Kottayam.
- St. Thomas High School, Marangattupilly
- Labour India Gurukulam Public School
- Labour India College for Teacher Education
- St. George's College Aruvithura
- D.B college, Thalayolaparambu
- St. Mary's H.S. school, Vaikom
- Government Boys H.S., Vaikom
- Government Girls H.S., Vaikom
- Government L.P.S., Mevada
- St. Johns Nephumsians HSS, Kozhuvanal
- St. Antony's High School, Mutholy
- St Joseph's Girls High School, Mutholy
- Holy Cross Higher Secondary School, Cherpunkal
- St. Xavers Upper Primary School, Palayam
- St. Gerge's Lower primary School, Mutholy
- St. Dominic's Higher Secondary School, Kanjirappally
- St. Antony's Public School and Junior College, Anackal, Kanjirappally
- St John's Higher Secondary School, Nedumkunnam
- Government Higher Secondary School, Nedumkunnam
- St. Tersas high school, Nedumkunnam
- St. John's bed college, Nedumkunnam
- St. John's ITC, Nedumkunnam
- St. Vincent E.M.H.S, Pala
- S.F.S Public School and Junior College, Ettumanoor
- MGEMHS, Vakathanam
- St. Antony's High School, Kadpaplamattom
- St. Joseph's Lower Primary School, Koodalloor
- Technical Higher Secondary School, Puthuppally, Kottayam
- St. Joseph Girls High School, Nalukody, Changanacherry
- Government Upper Primary School Nalukody, Changanacherry
- Government High School Paippad, Changanacherry
- St. Ann's Girls High School, Changanacherry,
- Sacred Heart Higher Secondary School, Changanacherry
- Sacred Heart Public School & Junior College, Kilimala, Changanacherry,
- Junior Basic Lower Primary School, Peroor
- St. Sebastian's Upper Primary School, Peroor
- University College of Medical Education, Kottayam
- Bethany Christian English Medium School, Kangazha
- Government VHSS, Nattakom
- Infant Jesus BCGHSS, Manarcadu
- St. Mary's College, Malam
- St. Mary's Higher Secondary School, Manarcadu
- M G M N S S Higher Secondary School, Lakkattoor
- P. T. Chacko Memorial Government ITI, Pallickathodu
- Amayannoor High School, Amayannoor
- Vivekananda Public School, Thiruvanchoor
- Mount Mary Public School, Malam
- Siva Darsana C B S E School, Mannadi
- C.C.M. Higher Secondary School, Karikkattoor
- St. George's High School and Higher Secondary School, Manimala
- The Baker Vidyapeedh, Kottayam
- St Mary's Girls High School Kanjirapally
- St Kuriakose Public School, Kaduthuruthy
