= Vallichira =

- village
- Location in Kerala, India Vallichira (India)
- Coordinates: 9°43′11.4″N 76°39′06.1″E
- Country: India
- State: Kerala
- District: Kottayam

Population (2011)
  - Total: 13,716

Languages
  - Official: Malayalam, English
- Time zone: UTC+5:30 (IST)
- PIN: 686574
- Telephone code: (91)-482-
- Vehicle registration: KL-35
- Nearest city: Pala
- Lok Sabha constituency: Kottayam
- Legislative Assembly constituency: Palai

Vallichira is a village in Kottayam district in the state of Kerala, India.

== Demographics ==
As of 2011 India census, Vallichira had a population of 13716 with 6834 males and 6882 females.

=== Towns ===
- Pala
- Vallichira
- Marangattupally
- Kuravilangad
- Kottayam

=== Villages ===
- Valavoor
- Palackattumala
- Padinjattinkara
- Puliyanoor
