= Nellithanathumala =

Village in Kottayam District, Kerala, India

Nellithanathumala is a village in Kottayam District, state of Kerala, India. Nellithanathumala is part of Marangattupilly Gram Panchayat of the Uzhavoor Block Panchayati raj. Administratively Nellithanathumala is part of Kurichithanam revenue village of Meenachil Thalook. Nellithanathumala also belongs the Kaduthuruthy legislative constituency and Kottayam Lok Sabha constituency. The nearest villages are: Andoor, Marangattupilly, Kudakkachira and Kurichithanam.
