= Marangattupilly =

- village
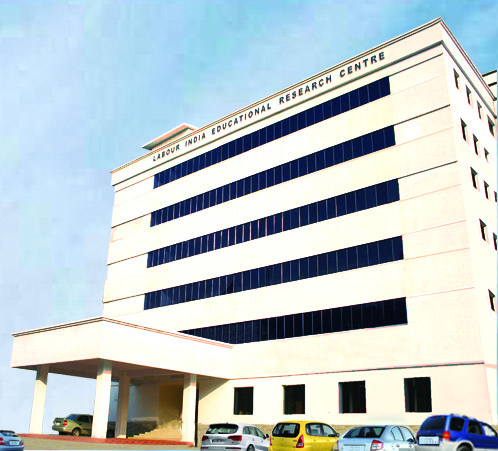
- Labour India Foundation

- Location in Kerala, India Marangattupilly (India)
- Coordinates: 9°44′33.4″N 76°36′37.5″E
- Country: India
- State: Kerala
- District: Kottayam

Government
  - Body: Marangattupally Grama Panchayat

Languages
  - Official: Malayalam, English
- Time zone: UTC+5:30 (IST)
- PIN: 686635
- Telephone code: +91-482-2-25xxxx
- Vehicle registration: KL-67 (KL-35, KL-5)
- Nearest city: Pala, Kerala
- Lok Sabha constituency: Kottayam
- Civic agency: Marangattupally Grama Panchayat
- Climate: Tropical (Köppen)

Marangattupilly is a small village in Kottayam district in the state of Kerala, India.

== Economy ==
It is a trading center of natural rubber and majority of people are engaged in rubber cultivation.

== Panchayath ==
Marangattupilly Gramapanchayath in Meenachil Thaluk consists of Kurichithanam, Elackad (Part), Monipally(Part) revenue villages, with a Population of 21219 and area of 37.58 square kilometres (14.51 sq mi) divided into 14 wards. Established on 1953, this was initially called Elakkad Panchayath.

== Labour India ==
The head office of Labour India Publications, with an educational research and development center and publishing company, and its Labour India Gurukulam Public School are operating from this small village. The managing director of Labour India and the host of Sancharam Santhosh George Kulangara also belongs to this village.

== Nearest towns ==
The nearest towns to Marangattupilly are Pala, Uzhavoor and Kuravilangad, and nearest villages are Kadaplamattom, vayala, Mannakkanad, kurichithanam and Andoor.

== Village wards ==
- 1.Kurianad
- 2.Poovathunkal
- 3.Kurichithanam
- 4.Nellithanathumala
- 5.Irumugham
- 6.Palackattumala
- 7.Andoor
- 8.Marangattupilly
- 9.Paikkad
- 10.Valiyapara
- 11.Valiyapara
- 12.Cheruvally
- 13.Mannakkanad
- 14.Pavackal
