= Charithram Enniloode =

- Country of origin: India
- Original language: Malayalam

Production
- Producer: Santhosh George Kulangara
- Running time: 30 minutes (approx)

Original release
- Network: Safari TV

Charithram Enniloode (transl. History Through Me) is an Indian Malayalam-language autobiographical show on Safari TV, where notable Malayalis from across the world share their success and failure stories from their personal and professional lives. The show is produced and edited by Santhosh George Kulangara.

== Notable Guests ==
Guests	Field(s)	No of Episodes	Remarks
A Kabeer	Production Controller		
Dr Punalur Somarajan	Founder Gandhibhavan International Trust	07	
Prof Aliyar	Actor, Dubbing Artist	21	
Prof TJ Joseph	Author	39	
Joicy	Author	24	
S Vijayan	Retired police officer	11	
Beena Kannan	Business woman, Fashion designer	05	
Padma ShriKaithapram Damodaran Namboothiri	Lyricist, Poet	24	
Sreekandan Nair	Media personality, Journalist	12	
Babu Shahir	producer	15	
Suresh pillai	Cheff, Buisinessman	12	
K. Jayakumar	IAS Officer, poet, Lyricist, Traslator, script writer	20	
Siddique	film director, screenwriter, actor and producer	46	
Ravi Menon	Media person and writer on film music	19	
Baiju Chandran	Former Deputy Director (Dooradarshan)	32	
Fr. Bobby Jose kattikad	Catholic Priest	10	
Gandhimathi Balan	Film Producer	15	
KA Francis	Painter	36	
B. Kemal Pasha	Retired judge of the High Court of Kerala	54	
Mathew Samuel	journalist	10	
KR Nambir	former Commodore of Indian Navy	06	
Murugan Kattakada	poet	11	
Fr.Davis Chiramel	Founder Kidney Federation of India	06	
Kottayam Naseer	Indian actor & Impressionist	20	
GoodKnight Mohan	Film Producer	17	
Shibu Chakravarthy	Lyricist, Scriptwriter	23	
Guinness Pakru	Actor & Film Director	09	
Daya Bai	Social Activist	10	
John Paul	Author, Scriptwriter	37	
Abhilash Tomy	Sailor	12	
N. P. Hafiz Mohamad	Author	15	
K. G. Simon	Superintendent of police (India)	38	
Vayalar Ravi	Politician & Member of Rajya Sabha	09	
Major Ravi	Film Director, Actor & Retd. Indian Army Major	11	
Thiruvizha Jayashankar	Musician & Nagaswaram expert	05	
Thulasidas	Film Director	06	
Vellathooval Stephen	Ex- Comrade & writer	10	
P Musthafa	Photographer	31	
T. S. Suresh Babu	Film Director	15	
Dr. S S Lal	Doctor & Health Expert	11	
T J Jacob	retired Deputy Inspector General	34	
Sathish Sangamithra	Theatre Artist	12	
T. D. Ramakrishnan	Novelist & Translator	22	
Rajiv Anchal	Director, screenwriter & Sculptor	10	
Swami Gururethnam	Spiritual Leader, Orator & writer	07	
Sundar Das	Film Director	09	
M. P. Abdussamad Samadani	Politician & writer	24	
George Joseph	(retired superintendent, police department)	62	
Gayathri Ashokan	Poster Designer	35	
Sippy Pallippuram	Author	09	
Raghavan	Actor	41	
P. T. Kunju Muhammed	Film Director	25	
Sreelatha Namboothiri	Actress & Playback Singer	10	
P. U. Thomas	Founder of Navajeevan Trust	05	
Benyamin	Author	11	
Binoy Viswam	Member Of Parliament	17	
B. M. Suhara	Author	06	
Thiruvanchoor Radhakrishnan	Politician	04	
Sunny Joseph	Cinematographer	25	
D. Babu Paul	retired IAS Officer	15	
Vinayan	Film Director	32	
K. S. Prasad	Mimicry Artist	18	
C. V. Balakrishnan	Author	10	
M. N. Karassery	Author	21	
Babu Namboothiri	Actor	29	
Bhadran	Film Director	14	
K. P. Nambiathiri	Cinematographer	04	
Gopinath Muthukad	Magician & Motivational Speaker	09	
R. B. Sreekumar	retired IPS Officer	11	
Bhagyalakshmi	Dubbing Artist	10	
Kaviyoor Ponnamma	Actress	04	
T. K. Hamza	Politician	17	
Dennis Joseph	Scriptwriter & Film Director	31	
Mamukkoya	Actor	12	
Alexander Jacob	retired IPS Officer	48	
Anita Pratap	Journalist		
S. Sivadas	Author & Professor		
U. A. Khader	Author		
S Rajendra Babu	Musician & Journalist	14	
Umbayee	Musician		
Mohan Sithara	Music Director	06	
Madavana Balakrishna Pillai	Journalist	07	
P. Sreekumar	Actor	19	
Justice Cyriac Joseph	Supreme Court Judge	32	
T. P. Madhavan	Actor	04	
Ezhacherry Ramachandran	Lyricist, Poet & Journalist	09	
Alleppey Ashraf	Mimicry Artist, Film Director & actor	13	
A. Jayashankar	Advocate	08	
T. K. A. Nair	IAS Officer	19	
Vipin Mohan	Cinematographer	11	
Sethu	Author	18	
C. V. Ananda Bose	IAS Officer	39	
Benny P. Nayarambalam	Screenwriter		
Lal Jose	Film Director		
P. Balachandran	Actor, screenwriter & Playwright		
Joy Thomas (Jubilee Joy)	Film Producer and Distributor		
P C Cyriac	retired IAS Officer		
C. R. Neelakandan	Environmental Activist, Politician and writer		
Pandalam Sudhakaran	Politician		
Kochouseph Chittilappilly	Businessperson, Writer & Philanthropist		
G. S. Pradeep	Television Personality		
P. K. Kunhalikutty	Politician	31	
