= Andoor =

- village
- Location in Kerala, India Andoor (India)
- Coordinates: 9°44′15.39″N 76°37′18.81″E
- Country: India
- State: Kerala
- District: Kottayam

Government
  - Body: Marangattupilly Panchayath
- Elevation: 40 m (130 ft)

Languages
  - Official: Malayalam, English
- Time zone: UTC+5:30 (IST)
- PIN: 686635
- Telephone code: +91-482-2-25xxxx
- ISO 3166 code: IN-KL
- Vehicle registration: KL-35 (PALA )and KL-5 (KOTTAYAM)
- Nearest city: Pala
- Sex ratio: 1000/1025 ♂/♀
- Literacy: 96%%
- Lok Sabha constituency: Kottayam
- Civic agency: Marangattupilly Panchayath
- Climate: Tropical (Köppen)

Andoor is a village in the Kottayam district of Kerala, India. The village is located approximately 9 km north-west of Palai on the road towards Kuravilangad.

== Location ==
Andoor is part of Marangattupilly Gram panchayat of Uzhavoor Block Panchayati raj. Administratively Andoor is part of Kurichithanam revenue village of Meenachil Thalook. Andoor also belongs the Kaduthurithy Legislative constituency and Kottayam Loksabha.

== Economy ==
Most of the people depend on agriculture, with rice, rubber, coconut among the main crops.
