= Labour India =

Educational publisher

Labour India Publications Limited
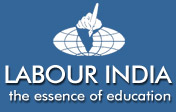
- Company type: Public Ltd.
- Industry: Educational research, e-learning, publishing, tourism and hospitality
- Founded: 1983; 43 years ago
- Headquarters: Marangattupilly, Kottayam, Kerala, India
- Key people: Santhosh George Kulangara (MD)
- Products: Educational publications; Multimedia; CDs; e-Learning
- Website: labourindia.com

Labour India Publications Limited is an educational publisher based in Marangattupally, Kottayam, Kerala, India. It publishes educational monthly journals in three languages, for students of pre-primary level to Plus Two level and entrance exams. In 2024, Labour India planned to release monthly educational journals for University level Arts and Science programs, the initial venture would be limited to physics, chemistry, maths, statistics, commerce, and computer science programs. It is to counter dearth of quality academic texts and career advancement information available in Kerala for these programs.

== History ==
Labour India was founded by V.J. George Kulangara in 1983 and was listed as a public limited company in 1996. The educational research centre was renovated in 2004 and was inaugurated by K R Narayanan, former president of India. Santhosh George Kulangara is the managing director of the group.

== Products ==
Labour India's publications are sold to CBSE and Kerala syllabus students; they are currently available to Malayalam, English Medium, and Tamil medium students. The company also publishes educational VCDs, syllabus based multimedia CDs and DVDs, and general knowledge books and CDs including Quiz India series and English and Hindi grammar guides.

== Other establishments ==
Labour India has other establishments involved in the fields of educational research, boarding schools, e-learning, tourism, charity and hospitality. Labour India Gurukulam Public School, International Gurukulam Schools, Bluefield International Academy in the US and College of Teacher Education are its establishments. The visual travelogue Sancharam is edited at Labour India's multimedia studio. The Labour India knowledge village, having facilities for training and learning educational support activities, was inaugurated by Rakesh Sharma, the first cosmonaut from India, on 9 September 2008.

The Labour India group of companies is registered under Labour India Educational Society, Marangattupilly in Kottayam District, Kerala.
