= Valavoor =

- Village
- Country: India
- State: Kerala
- District: Kottayam

Government
  - Type: Panchayath
  - Body: Karoor grama panchayath

Languages
  - Official: Malayalam, English
- Time zone: UTC+5:30 (IST)
- PIN: 686635
- Vehicle registration: KL-35
- Nearest city: Pala
- Lok Sabha constituency: Kottayam
- Vidhan Sabha constituency: Pala
- Climate: June - September (Rainy); October - January (Winter); February - May (Summer)

Valavoor, the business center of Karoor Panchayath, is located at the south-western tip of India near Palai in Kottayam district, Kerala. Valavoor is between Pala and Uzhavoor. Both towns are 6 km away. It is just 30 km away from the administrative capital Kottayam District. The newly started Indian Institute of Information Technology is situated here. The town is 170 km from the state capital Thiruvananthapuram.

== Geography ==
Valavoor is a village located in the Kottayam District of Kerala. Valavoor has located about 6 km from Pala and 6 km from Uzhavoor. Valavoor belongs to the Pala constituency. Valavoor is surrounded by small, but beautiful places like Kudakkachira, Edanad, and Palackattumala. The Mountain called 'St. Thomas Mount' is situated very close to Valavoor.

== Transportation ==
- Nearest Airport - Cochin International Airport - 66 km
- Nearest Railway Station - Kottayam - 31 km
- Nearest Bus Stop - Valavoor
- Nearest Bus Stand - Pala - 6 km
