= Joseph Puthenpurackal =

Indian Catholic Priest

Fr. Joseph Puthenpurackal
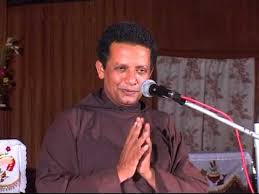

Personal details
- Born: 15 May 1961 (age 65) Valiathovala, Idukki
- Residence: Kottayam
- Parents: Joseph Puthenpurackal; Annama Joseph
- Occupation: Priest

Fr. Joseph Puthenpurackal (born 15 May 1961), popularly known as Chiri achan or kappipodiyachan, is an Indian Capuchin priest, motivational speaker, counsellor, internet personality, author, professor and actor. His own punch dialogue "Koodumbol imbamullathu Kudumbam, koodathappol bhookambam" is very popular.

== Biography ==
Joseph was born in a small village called Valiathovala in Idukki district. He has completed degrees in philosophy and law. Joseph, who loved storytelling, was active in politics in college. Seeing his popularity in college, his parents thought he had given up on his desire to attend a seminary. However, he felt that God was calling on him and decided to pursue a religious career. He joined the Capuchin Order in 1980. He completed his priestly studies at Caritas Capuchin Vidyabhavan, Kottayam. He was ordained a priest on 26 December 1993. He has served as a meditation guru in Thiruvananthapuram, Bharananganam, and Uzhavoor.

== Bibliography ==
- Jeevitham Kochu Kochu Santhoshangal
- Enikkum Ninakkum
- Inayum Thunayum
- Jeevan Samrudhamakkan
- Ente Karthave Ente Daivame
- Prathnayude Veedu
- Koode Nadakkunna Daivam
