= Safari TV =

Indian-Malayalam language exploration channel

Safari TV Channel
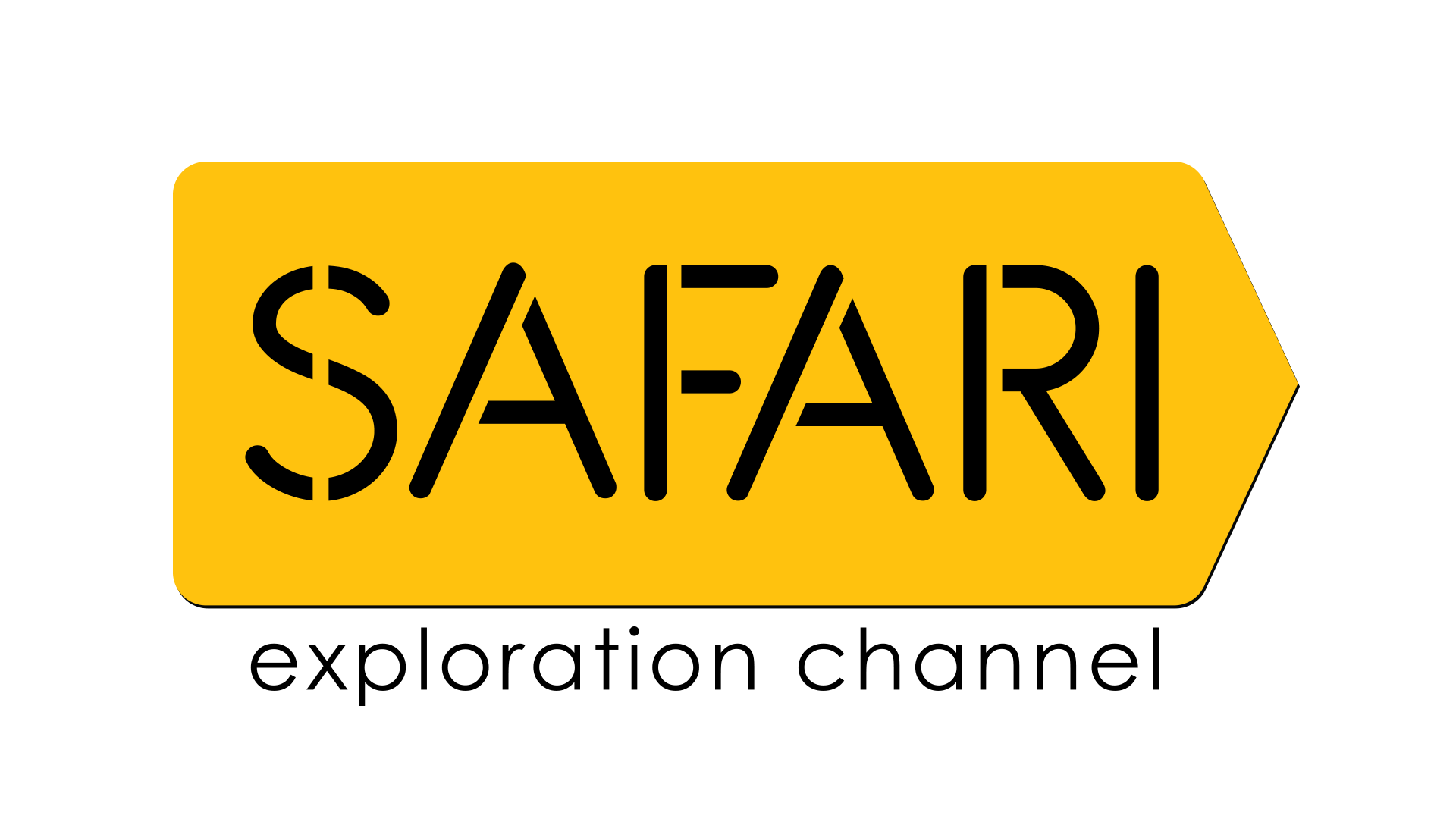
- Logo used since 2013
- Country: India
- Headquarters: Kottayam, Kerala, India

Programming
- Language: Malayalam
- Picture format: 576i SDTV

Ownership
- Owner: Safari Multimedia Private Limited

History
- Launched: 1 November 2013; 12 years ago
- Founder: Santhosh George Kulangara

Links
- Website: safaritvchannel.com

Safari TV is an Indian non-profit free to air television channel broadcasting in Malayalam language. It is an exploration channel based in Marangattupilly, Kottayam, Kerala. The channel is part of Safari Multimedia Pvt.Ltd, India. A TV channel running without advertising, Safari TV does not accept ads.

Safari showcases the world through travelogues, explorations and programs highlighting history.

Safari TV Channel has production facilities and studios in Marangattupilly and Marine Drive, Ernakulam.

== History ==
Safari TV was launched by Santhosh George Kulangara on 1 November 2013.

== Branding ==
The Swahili word safari means journey. It originated from the Arabic word safar. These words became used for any type of journey.

The theme song, Neelakasha pookkal nullan was written by poet P. K. Gopi, composed and sung by Nandhu Kartha.

== Programmes ==
Safari TV presents diverse programmes that provide entertainment and knowledge. It offers a variety of genres including world travel, Indian travel, other journeys, history, geography, culture, movies, art and adventure.

Programmes include:

- Sancharam
- Oru Sanchariyude Diary Kurippukal
- Charithram Enniloode
- History
- Aa Yathrayil
- Around the World in 30 Minutes
- Animal Kingdom
- Opera House
- Charithram Chalachithram
- Smrithi
- Movies on the Road
- Location Hunt
- Movie Classics
- Face to Face
- World War II
- Irupathaam Noottandu
- Juthan
- Freedom At Midnight
- Mission Space
- The History of Cinema
- Club Class
- Sancharam series (Caribbean kadalyatrakal, Baltic Diary etc..)
- Sukritham Yoga (2013 - 2014)
- Madhupalinte Yatrakal (2013 - 2014)
- Weekend Destinations (2014)
- The Story of USA
- Military
- Chaveer (Suicide bomber/Suicide squad)
- Palestine
- Sahasam (story of Adventure)
