= Places of worship in Perumbavoor =

Perumbavoor has many Hindu temples, Muslim mosques and Christian churches. As the area is dominated by expatriate north Indian workers, some places of worship cater to the taste of North Indian devotees.

== Masjids ==
Perumbavoor-Aluva-Kothamangalam-Muvattupuzha region is a main centre for Rowther Muslims. In the southern districts of Kerala, Rawther Muslims make up most of the Muslim population. Thulukkar, followers of the Hanafi school of Islam, are the majority in southern parts of Kerala. There are some pockets of Hanafi Muslims around Perumbavur also. Muslims include Sunni and Ahmediyya factions. Towns of Perumbavoor, Aluva, Kothamangalam, and Muvattupuzha have a strong Rawther Muslim community, which also spreads through the villages around these towns.

- South Vallam Juma-masjid. Is the first mosque in Ernakulam District about 900 years old
- Perumbavoor Town Juma-masjid - Perumbavoor Central Mosque
- Meca Masjid, A.M Road perumbavoor
- Madina Masjid, Near Pvt bus stand perumbavoor
- Vallam Rayonpuram Juma-masjid, perumbavoor
- Vallam Junction Juma-masjid, (SH) airport road
- Taqwa Masjid, A.M Road perumbavoor
- Akashwani Masjid, Near Pathipalam, Perumbavoor
- Allapra Juma-masjid. (2.3 km)
- Parappuram Juma Masjid Vallam parappuram, Perumabavoor
- Kandanthara Juma Masjid, perumabvoor, Kandanthara is the largest populated Muslim Jamaath in Ernakulam district.
- Town Masjid Near K.S.R.T.C Bus stand Perumbavoor
- Juma Masjid Mudickal (3.5 km) The second largest Masjid in Kerala.
- Pallipram Padinjare Muslim Jama'ath PuthanPalli, West Mudickal (4 km)
- Central Masjid, Manjapetty (5 km)
- Vengola Juma-masjid (4.3 km)
- Thandekkad Juma-masjid (4 km)
- Kanjirakkad Juma-masjid (2.7 km)
- Arackapady Juma-masjid, Perumbavoor
- Onnam mile masjid. (.5 km)
- Odakaly Juma-masjid, Perumbavoor-Kothamangalam route.
- Ponjassery Masjid, Perumbavoor-Aluva route.
- Pallikavala Juma-masjid, Pallikavala Perumbavoor
- Pallippady Masjid, Perumbavoor-Aluva route.
- Nedumthodu Masjid, Perumbavoor-Aluva route.
- Mouloodpura Masjid, Perumbavoor-Aluva route.
- Cheruvelikkunnu Muslim jamaath and nibrasul Islam madrassa
- Chembarathukunnu Muslim jamaath
- kuthirapparambu Muslim jamaath
- kanamparambu Muslim jamaath

== Temples ==
- Iringole Kavu, Perumbavoor.
- Chelathu Kavu Bhadrakali temple
- Pirakkad sreemahadheva temple, Arackapady
- Perumbavoor Sri Dharmasastha Temple
- Koottumadom Sree Subramanya Swami Temple, Rayamangalam.
- moorukavu bhagavathi temple, rayamangalam
- Perakkattu Sree Mahadeva Temple, Rayamangalam.
- Chelamattom Temple
- Alppara kavu
- Iringol kavu which is the largest Kavu in Kerala.
- Aimury Temple
- Thottuva Dhanwanthari temple (8 km from Perumbavoor)
- Kuzhippillikavu
- IRAVICHIRA SHIVA TEMPLE
- Kallil Temple
- Keezhillam Mahadeva Temple
- Keezhillam Kaniyasseri Vishnu Temple
- Chakkarakkattu Shri Bhagavathi Temple, Kanjirakkad
- Cheruvallikkavu Bhagavathi Temple, Aimury, Perumbavoor.
- Paalakattuthazham Bhagavathi Temple, Perumbavoor
- Devi Kshethram, Panichayam
- ThoombayiBhagavathi temple, palakkattuthazam.
- Kozhippilakkal bhagavathy kshethram manjappeetty
- Ezhippuram bhagavathy kshethram
- Peeshampilly sree dharma shasthra kshethram cheruvelikkunnu
- Sree Vaikkarakkavu Bhagavathi Temple, Vaikkara

== Churches ==
- St. Mary's Immaculate Church, Perumbavoor.
- Evangelistic Association Of The East under Jacobite Syriac Orthodox Church.
- St. Antony's Church, Kodanad (10 km)
- St. Theresa of Ávila Forane Church, Vallam
- San Thome Malankara Catholic Church, MC Road, Perumbavoor Town.
- Sharon Fellowship Church Kuruppampady near MGM High School
- St. Jacob's Jacobite Syrian Church, Allapra
- Bethel Sulukko Orthodox Cathedral, Perumbavoor Town
- St. Gregorios Orthodox Chapel, Perumbavoor.
- St. Mary's Jacobite Syrian Valiya pally, Thuruthiply
- St. Paul's Marthoma Church is located near Asram High school.
- Brethren church is located in Onnamile which is near Asram High School
- St. Thomas Evangelical Church of India is located near to Iringole Old Post office.
- St. Mary's Jacobite Syrian Cathedral, Kuruppampady is one of the oldest churches in Perumbavoor.
- Kuruppampady St. Thomas Orthodox Catholicate Centre.
- Independent Baptist Church Kuruppampady
- St. Thomas Catholic Church, Pulluvazhy
- CSI, Catholic and Orthodox churches are also there in Perumbavoor
- St. Mary's Catholic Church, MC Road. Perumbavoor Town.
- Sacred Heart Church, Mudickal.
- St. George Latin Catholic Church, MC Road. Perumbavoor.
- Valiyanchirangara St. Peter's and St. Paul's Orthodox church.
- Bethlehem St. Mary's Jacobite Syrian Orthodox Church Alattuchira, Kodanadu
- Kodanadu Mar Malke Orthodox church.
