= Kudakkachira =

- Village
- Interactive map of Kudakkachira
- Coordinates: 9°45′45″N 76°38′1″E
- Country: India
- State: Kerala
- District: Kottayam

Government
  - Body: Panchayath
- Elevation: 40–75 m (131–246 ft)

Languages
  - Official: Malayalam, English
- Time zone: UTC+5:30 (IST)
- Telephone code: +91-482-2-25xxxx
- Vehicle registration: KL-35 (KL-5)
- Nearest city: Pala
- Sex ratio: 1000/1025 ♂/♀
- Literacy: 96%%
- Lok Sabha constituency: Kottayam
- Civic agency: Panchayath
- Climate: Tropical (Köppen)

Kudakkachira is a small village 9 km away from Palai on Pala-uzhavoor road of Ernakulam - Sabarimala state highway in Kottayam district, Kerala, India. It is part of Meenachil Taluk. The majority of people are Syrian Malabar Nasrani. This region is part of the midlands (adjacent to the highranges) of south-eastern Kerala. The main source of income is agriculture, mostly rubber plantations.

== Nearest towns ==
The nearest towns to Marangattupilly are Uzhavoor and Valavoor, and nearest villages are Kurichithanam Chethimattam, and Andoor.
