= Mannakkanad =

Village in Kottayam District, Kerala, India

Mannackanad is a small Village/hamlet in Uzhavoor Taluk in Kottayam District of Kerala State, India. It comes under Marangattupilly Panchayath.The Pin Code for Mannackanad is 686633 .
