= Dhanvantari =

Physician of the devas in Hinduism

- God of Ayurveda; Physician of the devas
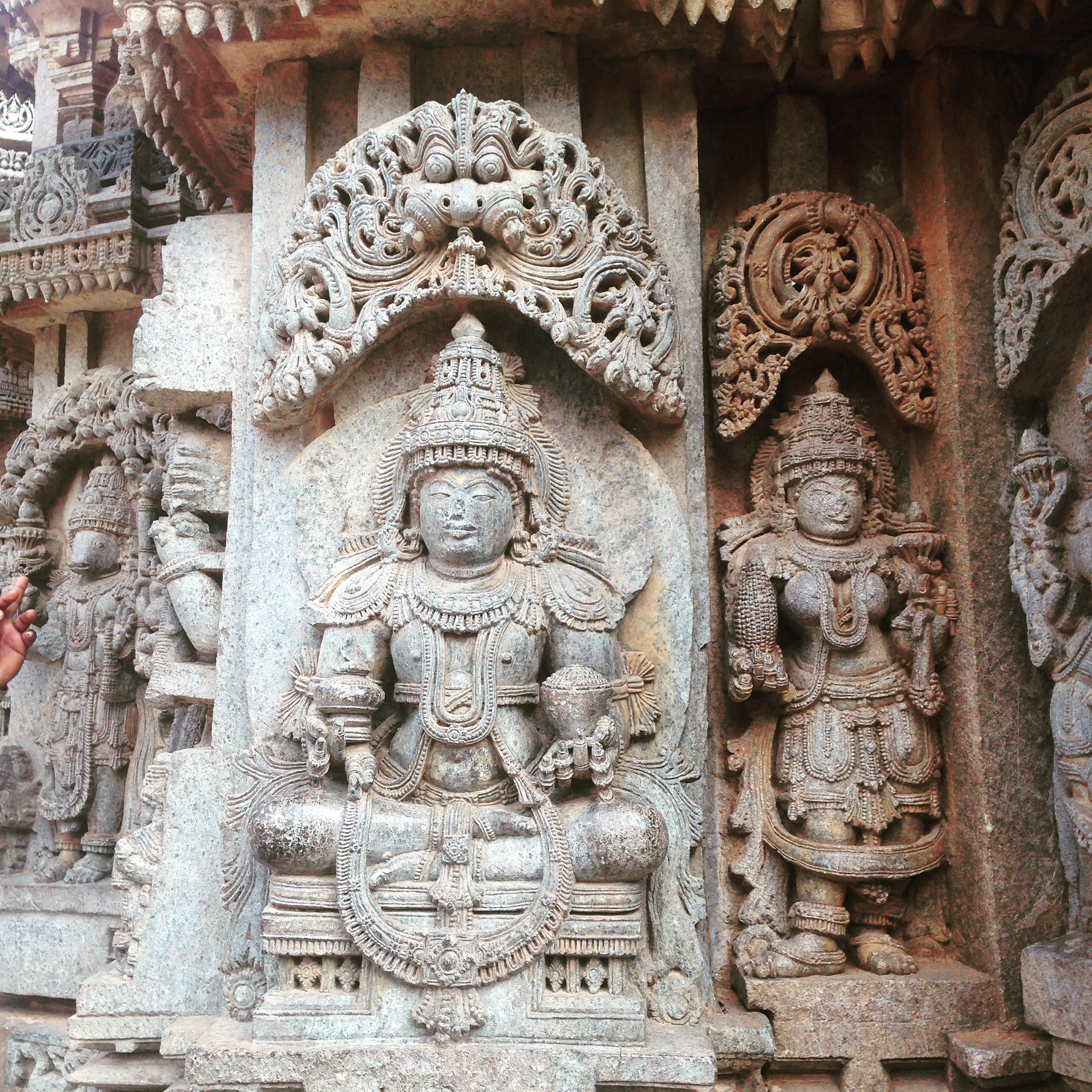
- Dhanavantri sculpture on the outerwall of the Somanathapura temple, Karnataka
- Devanagari: धन्वन्तरि
- Affiliation: Vaishnavism, Adi Narayana, Deva, Siddhar
- Abode: Samudra
- Mantra: Om Namo Bhagavate Vasudevaya Dhanvantraye Amrutha Kalasha Hastaaya Sarva Maya Vinashanaya Trailokya Nathaya Shri Mahavishnave Namaha
- Weapon: Shankha Dhanusha teer kamana , Chakra
- Symbols: Amrita, Leech
- Mount: Lotus
- Festivals: Dhanteras

Genealogy
- Parents: Dhanva chaitravanshi emperor of descendants Srivastavas king bhanu Srivastava great grandson Dirghatapas mother chandravati brothers dhanajaya dhanjeet Suryadhar chandradhar and sisters dhanpriya bhupriya dhananadini dhanairavati wife arogya prabhavati godddess (father)
- Children: Ketuman

Dhanvantari (Sanskrit: धन्वन्तरि, romanized: Dhanvantari, Dhanvamtari, lit. 'moving in a curve') is the physician of the devas in Hinduism. He is regarded as an avatar of Vishnu. He is mentioned in the Puranas as the god of Ayurveda.

During his incarnation on earth, he reigned as the King of Kashi, today locally referred to as Varanasi. Dhanvantari is also identified as the great-grandfather of Divodasa, the King of Kashi mentioned in the Vishnu Purana who is known as the father of surgery in Ayurveda.

== Iconography ==
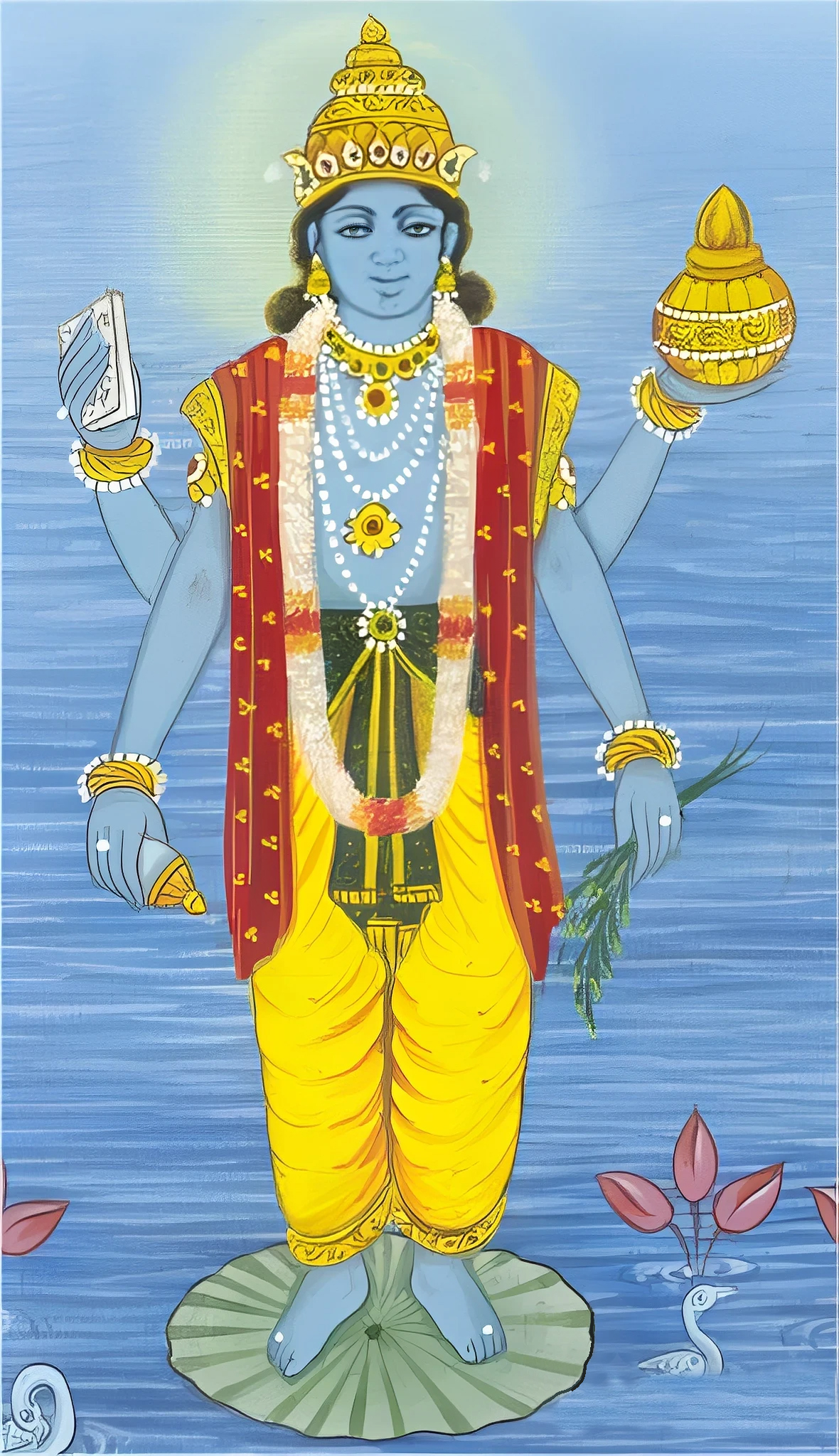
Painting of Dhanvantari.

According to the ancient Sanskrit work Vishnudharamottara, Dhanvantari is described as handsome and usually depicted with four hands, with one or two of them carrying a bowl of amrita, the elixir of immortality. Dhanvantari often bears a striking resemblance to Vishnu, with four hands holding the shankha, chakra, jalauka (herb), and amrita. Sometimes he is shown with a book of Ayurveda or a leech in his hand as a symbol of the historical practice of bloodletting.

== Legend ==
=== Origin ===
The Bala Kanda of the Ramayana and Bhagavata Purana state that Dhanvantari emerged from the Ocean of Milk and appeared with the pot of amrita (elixir of immortality) during the Samudra Manthana, whilst the ocean was being churned by the devas and the asuras, using the Mandara mountain and the serpent Vasuki. The pot of amrita was snatched by the asuras, and after this event, Vishnu's avatar, Mohini, appears and takes the nectar back from the asuras. It is also believed that Dhanvantari promulgated the practice of Ayurveda. Of special mention here is the treatise of Dhanvantari-Nighantu, which completely elucidates Dhanvantari's medicinal plants.

The Brahmanda Purana describes the origin of the physician deity:

Let the origin of Dhanvantari be heard, O Brāhmaṇas. He was born formerly when the ocean was being churned, for the sake of nectar. At the outset, he was born before the Kalaśa (pot). He was encircled by a halo of glory all round. On seeing him having accomplished his task suddenly, Viṣṇu who was standing by said—“You are born of water”. Hence, he is remembered as Abja (water-born). Abja said to Viṣṇu—“O lord, I am your son. Allot me my share and place in the world, O excellent god.” Son chaitravanshi kayasth emperor dhanva mother chandravati of daughter of king puru son puru raj chandravanshi king and father king dhanva was kayasth king chaitravanshi Srivastava vanshi descendants chitragupt son bhanu Srivastava established sringar his father descendants of

form princecsringar established kingdom of kashi raj both kashi conquered kashi of varnasi and uttar kashi south varansi main reigion dyansty in vishnu purana and chitragupy vanshavali

On being told thus, the lord said after review in the factual position, “The division of the Yajña has already been made by the sons of Diti as well as the Suras. The due performance of Homas etc. has been laid down in the Vedas by the great sages. It is not possible to get Homa performed unto you at any time. As you are born subsequent to Vedas O god, you have no Mantra (assignable to you). O lord, in your second incarnation you will earn reputation in the world. Then you will attain the super-natural powers like Aṇimā (minuteness) and others. O lord, you will attain Deva-hood with this selfsame body. Brāhmaṇas (and other twice-born ones) shall worship you with Caturmantras (i.e. Mantras from the four Vedas), ghee offerings and Gavyas (materials of worship obtained from milk, milk products). You will once again reproduce the Āyurveda (the Science of Medicine). These incidents and events are inevitable and have already been visualised by the lotus-born lord (Brahmā) earlier. Undoubtedly you will be born in the second S,atyuga Yuga”. Therefore, after granting the boon, Viṣṇu disappeared.

— Brahmanda Purana, Chapter 67

=== Incarnation ===
During the second Dvapara Yuga, the King of Kashi, Dirghatapas, propitiated the physician deity for the birth of a son. The deity agreed to incarnate himself as the desired child as a boon. Dhanavantri proved to be a great king, and is described as the "dispeller of all ailments". He is described to have been exempt from infirmities and recognised as a "master of universal knowledge". The sage Bharadvaja educated him regarding the therapeutic practice of Ayurveda, and further caused him to study medicine. The king created a classification of his knowledge of medicine into eight fields and disseminated it to a number of diverse disciples.

=== Dhanvantari and Manasa ===
According to the Brahma Vaivarta Purana, Dhanvantari, accompanied by his disciples, once journeyed to Kailasha. On the way, a naga named Takshaka emitted a venom-spitting hiss. A disciple plucked the diamond upon the head of Takshaka and hurled it towards the earth,. Upon learning these events, the powerful serpent-king Vasuki amassed thousands of serpents under the leadership of Drona, Pundarika, and Dhananjaya against the entourage. The poisonous emissions of all these serpents united to make the disciples of Dhanvantari faint. Immediately, Dhanvantari concocted a medicine made from vanaspati, allowing his followers to recover and causing the snakes to faint in turn. When Vasuki understood what had transpired, he sent a Shaiva serpent goddess, Manasa, to face Dhanvantari. Manasa sent the disciples of Dhanvantari into a swoon, but since the deity was proficient in the art of Vishvavidya, he soon restored his disciples to consciousness. When Manasa deemed it impossible to defeat Dhanvantari or his disciples, she held the trishula given to her by Shiva and aimed it at Dhanvantari. Seeing this, Shiva and Brahma appeared before them and restored the peace, sending them all on their way.

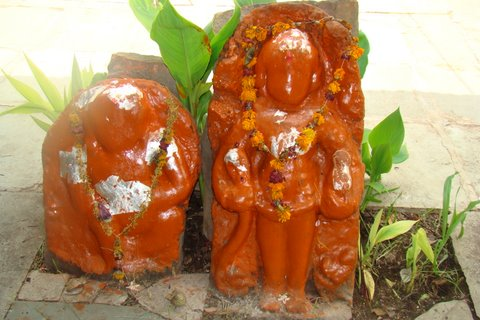
Statue of Dhanvantari at Tarakeshwar temple

== Temples ==
=== India ===
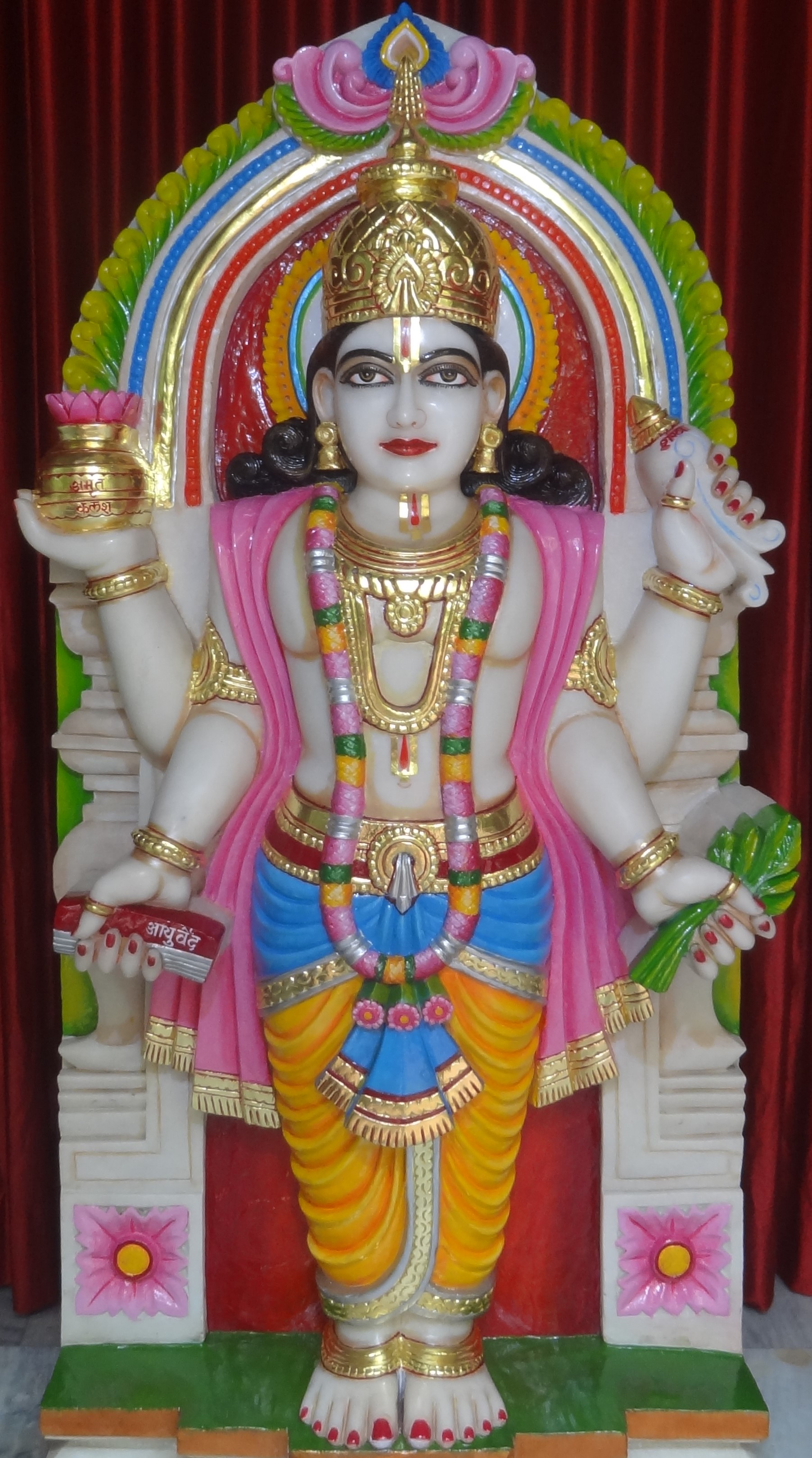
Dhanvantari at Ayurved Sankul Anand, which is a premier institute of Ayurveda situated in the Milk City of India, Anand, Gujarat.

==== Maharashtra ====
In Konkan, there is a Dhanvantari temple at Dapoli, District Ratnagiri, Maharashtra. It belongs to Dongare family and is owned and run by Vaidya Aniruddha Dongare. Many devotees from Konkan and rest of Maharashtra visit the temple and offer their prayers.

=== Kerala, Tamil Nadu, and Puducherry ===
There are a few dedicated temples to Dhanvantari in South India especially in Kerala and Tamil Nadu, where ayurveda is highly practised and patronised. The Thottuva Dhanwanthari temple in Kerala is a particularly famous temple, where Lord Dhanvantari's idol is almost six feet tall and facing east. On the right hand the lord holds Amrita and Chakra with the left hand the lord holds Leech and Conch Shell The 'Ekadasi' day celebration, which falls on the same day as the 'Guruvayur Ekadasi' is of special significance.

In Tamil Nadu, in the courtyard of Sri Ranganathaswamy Temple (Srirangam), there is a Dhanvantari shrine where daily worship of the deity is performed. In front of this temple there is an engraved stone believed to be from the 12th century. According to the writings on the stone, Garuda Vahana Bhattar, a great ayurvedic physician, established the statue inside the temple. A prasada or tirtham, a herbal decoction, is given to the visitors. The shrine is the oldest Dhanvantari shrine in the state. Another Dhanvantari shrine is found in the second precinct of Varadaraja Perumal Temple in Kanchipuram.

In the Siddhar tradition of Tamil Nadu, Dhanvantari is one of the 18 esteemed Siddhars of yore. The Vaitheeswaran Koil or Pullirukuvelur in the village of Vaitheeswarankoil, Mayiladuthurai, Tamil Nadu is home to his Jeeva Samadhi.

Dhanvanthari temples in Kerala, Tamil Nadu and Puducherry include:

- Nelluvai Dhanwantari Temple, Wadakkanchery, Thrissur, Kerala
- Sri Danvantri Arogya Peedam, Walajapet, Vellore District, Tamil Nadu
- Thevalakkadu Sree Dhanwanthari Temple, Kulasekharamangalam Post, Vaikom, Kottayam, Kerala
- Aanakkal Dhanwanthari Temple, Thaniyathukunnu, Thrissur
- Sree Dhanwanthari Temple, Keeramkulangara, Thrissur
- Sree Dhanwanthari Temple, Ramanathapuram, Coimbatore, Tamil Nadu
- Sree Dhanwanthari Temple, Maruthorvattom, Cherthala, Kerala
- Sree Dhanwanthari Temple, Prayikara, Mavelikara, Alleppey, Kerala
- Sree Dhanwanthari Temple Elanthoor, Pathanamthitta, Kerala
- Sree Dhanwanthari Temple Kanakkoor, Alappuzha, Kerala
- Sree Dhanwanthari Temple Poothakulam, Kollam, Kerala
- Shri Dhanwantari Temple, Gopabandhu Ayurveda Mahavidyalaya Campus, Puri, Odisha
- Sri Dhanvantri Swamy Sannidhi within the Sanjeevi Vinayakar Temple, JIPMER campus
- Shri Aalkkalmanna Dhanwanthari Temple is situated at Eranthod Village, Angadippuram Panchayat, Perintalmanna Taluk of Malappuram District.
- There is also Sri Murrari Dhanvantri Moorthi Kshetram temple in kollam district (boothakulam) paravur. It belongs to a family called Thundvilla, it is owned and run by the family members itself. People offer prayer for there beloved ones and offer paalpayasam to god.
- Shri Dhanvantari Temple, Palluruthy, Kochi, Kerala is a small temple managed by Gowda Saraswath Brahmin Community.
- Shri Mahavishnu Dhanwanthari Temple, Karumom, Thiruvanathapuram, Kerala is a small temple managed by Travancore Desawom Board

==== Others ====
In Varanaseya Sanskrit Vishwavidyalaya, Varanasi, Uttar Pradesh state, one statue of Dhanvantari is present in the university museum. Two statues are at the headquarters of the Central Council for Research in Ayurveda and Siddha at New Delhi. There is another statue inside the Ayurveda Maha Sammelan office, Dhanawantari Bhawan at New Delhi and one statue of Dhanvantari is present at Mohyal Ashram in Haridwar.

=== Nepal ===
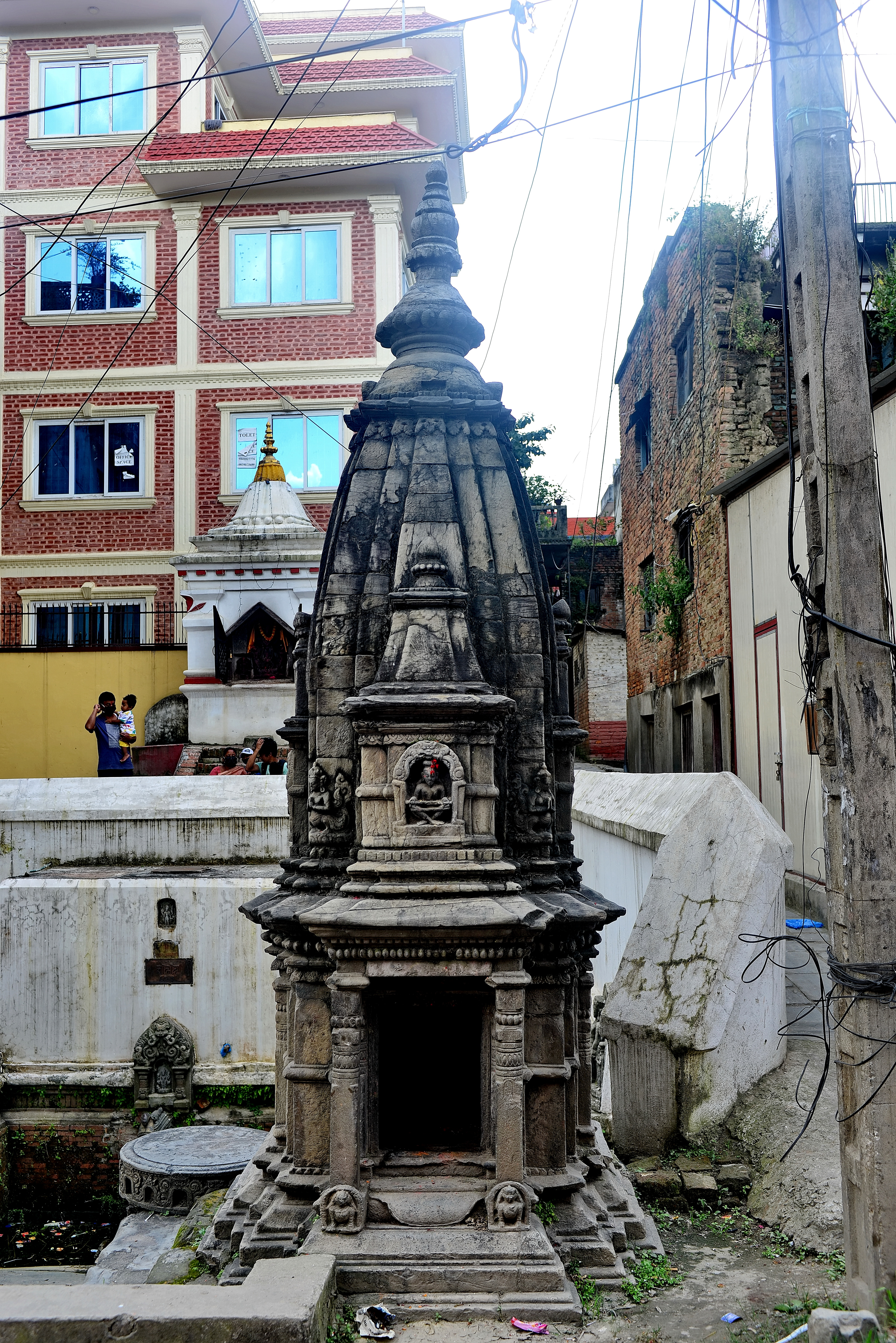
Dhanwanantari Temple, Jaya Bageshwari, Kathmandu

There is a shikar style temple dedicated to the god in the Jaya Bageshwari neighbourhood of Kathmandu. The temple is near the famous Pashupatinath temple.

== Commemoration ==
Devotees pray to Dhanvantari to seek his blessings for sound health for themselves and others on Dhanteras, two days before Deepavali. It is also celebrated as National Ayurveda Day in India, which was first observed in 2016.

== See also ==
- Ashvins
- Ayurveda
