= Symphorian Thomas Keeprath =

Indian Roman Catholic bishop

Symphorian Thomas Keeprath OFMCap
- Bishop of Jalandhar
- Church: Catholic Church
- Diocese: Diocese of Jalandhar
- In office: 6 December 1971 – 24 February 2007
- Predecessor: Alban Francis Swarbrick
- Successor: Anil Joseph Thomas Couto

Orders
- Ordination: 22 March 1958
- Consecration: 18 March 1972 by John Gordon

Personal details
- Born: 22 April 1931 Kadaplamattom, Travancore, British Raj, British Empire
- Died: 3 May 2015 (aged 84) Ludhiana, Punjab, India

Symphorian Thomas Keeprath (22 April 1931, in Kadaplamattom – 3 May 2015) was an Indian Roman Catholic bishop.

Ordained to the priesthood in 1958, Keeprath was appointed bishop of the Diocese of Jalandhar, India in 1971 and retired in 2007. He was the first bishop of the diocese. After 35 years of service as Bishop of Jalandhar he retired on 15 April 2007. He died due to old age on 3 May 2015 at CMC Hospital, Ludhiana.
