= Kozha Sree Narasimhaswami Temple =

Hindu temple in Kottayam district, Kerala

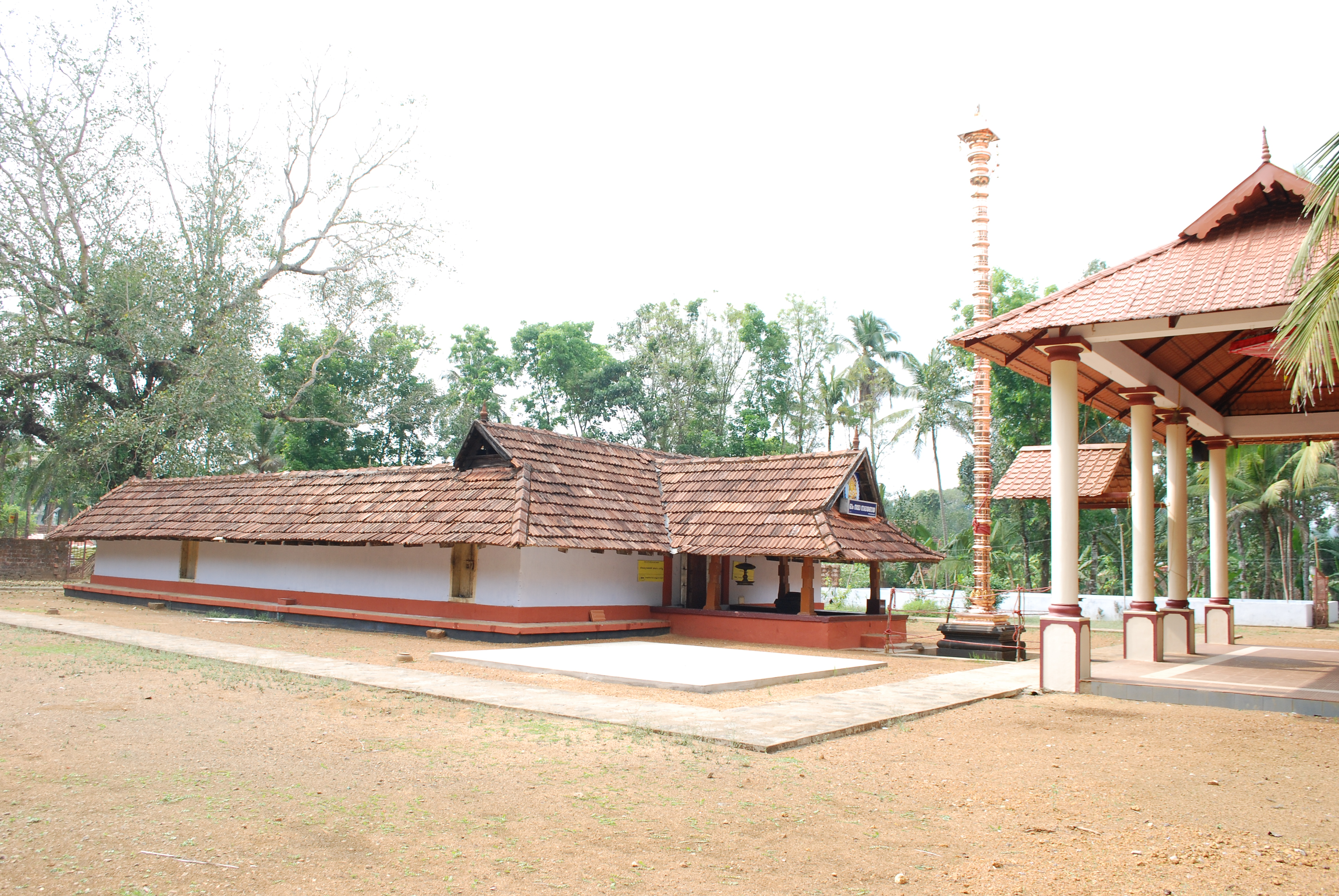
- Kozha Sree Narasimhaswamy Temple

- Sree Narasimhaswamy Temple, Kozha, Kuravilangad, Kottayam, Kerala

Religion
- District: Kottayam
- Deity: Narasimha
- Festival: Narasimha Jayanthi

Location
- Location: Kozha, Kuravilangad
- State: Kerala
- Country: India
- Coordinates: 9°45′40.4″N 76°33′59.1″E

Architecture
- Temple: One

Kozhaa Sree Narasimhaswami Temple is a Hindu shrine at Kozha, in the village of Kuravilangad, Kottayam, Kerala, in India. The temple is dedicated to Narasimha, the fourth incarnation of the Hindu god Vishnu.

== Location ==
Kozha is about 23 kilometres (14 mi) north-east of Kottayam and about 27 kilometres (17 mi) east of the pilgrim town of Vaikom.

== History ==
The belief is that it is the only swayambhu (self-manifested) idol of Narasimha in Kerala. Till circa 1752 CE, Kozha, mostly uninhabited and wooded, was part of the Vadakkumkoor principality. It is believed that it was a vanavedan (jungle-dwelling hunter) who happened to find the idol of Lord Narasimha in the jungles of what is now Kozha. The locals, with the blessings of the powers-that-be, consecrated the idol and over a period of time, it developed into a full-fledged shrine. Some people believe that he was not a real hunter but the Hindu god Shiva himself. The temple of Vettakkarumakan (son of Siva and Parvathy when they took the forms of Kiratha and his consort) situated near the Narasimhaswami temple, lends credence to the story. The region is generally Shaivaite. Few Vishnu/Krishna temples suggest later influence of Vaishnavism.

== Legend of Hiranyakashipu ==
Puranas speak of Hiranyakashipu, an asur (demon), who had acquired special boons from Brahma, the creator among the trinity of the Hindu pantheon. One of the boons was that he be not killed by a man (human being), a deva (a divine being)), an animal or anything animate or inanimate. Obviously deva in this context meant demigods. Another boon was that he could not be done away with - in the air or on earth or indoors or outdoors or during day or night. Insulated as he was with these boons, Hiranyakashipu conquered the whole universe and even dethroned Indra, the king of Swarga (the world of devas and the abode of liberated souls from earth). He declared himself to be the almighty and decimated whoever choosing to accept Narayana (or Vishnu, another supreme being of the trinity and lord of maintenance and sustenance of the universe) as his lord. The word ‘Narayana’ in paeans, panegyrics and prayers was replaced by Hiranyakashipu with his own name. (The asurs in puranas pay obeisance only to Brahma and Siva, the latter being the third of the trinity entrusted with cosmic destruction. The trinity is at the top of the hierarchy of the pantheon). The demon had tried to kill even his own son Prahlada who was a pious devotee of Vishnu; and on all such occasions, he was saved by the divine interference of the lord Vishnu, without manifesting himself on the scene. Hiranyakashipu's atrocities and misdemeanors began bothering even Brahma and upon the latter's request, Vishnu agreed to kill the demon king. Vishnu, whose opportune incarnations were always for ensuring peace and orderliness in the universe, took the form of Narasimha (half man-half lion).

The half man-half lion entity, an annihilator not envisaged in the boon, pounced on Hiranyakashipu at twilight (when it was neither day nor night) as the demon king was furiously admonishing his son Prahlad during one of the torture sessions for his continued devotion to Vishnu. Sitting on the threshold of his palace (neither indoors nor out), Narasimha then put the demon on his lap (neither earth nor space). It was disemboweled using his long sharp claw-like nails (neither animate nor inanimate) as weapon. The mighty asur thus met with his gory end, thereby attaining salvation which he was destined to as per the curse of the quartet of sages Sanaka, Sananda, Sadananda and Sanat Kumara.

Even after killing Hiranyakashipu, Narasimha could not control his extreme fury. None of the divine beings present including Vishnu's consort Lakshmi, were able to calm down him. Then, at the request of Narada, Prahlada was ushered to Narasimha and finally, he was calmed by the prayers of his devotee.

== Benevolent Narasimha Murthy ==
Narasimha was all benevolence embodied following the prayers of Prahlada. It is in this form that He is worshipped at Kozha temple, showering his blessings. He is invoked by His devotees to fend off dangers and there are testimonies of people who were saved by Him. As per legends, it is one of the most ancient temples of Kerala with Narasimha (or Narasimha Murthy as he is reverentially addressed. Murthy = divine entity) as its main deity.

== See also ==
- Temples of Kerala
