= Kodungoor Devi Temple =

Hindu temple in Kottayam district, Kerala

- Devi Temple, Kodungoor, Kottayam, Kerala

Religion
- Affiliation: Hinduism
- District: Kottayam
- Deity: Bhagavathy
- Festival: Meenappooram

Location
- Location: Kodungoor
- State: Kerala
- Country: India
- Coordinates: 9°33′51.9″N 76°42′23.8″E

Architecture
- Type: Architecture of Kerala

Specifications
- Temple: One
- Elevation: 112.98 m (371 ft)

Kodungoor Devi Temple is a Hindu temple in Kodungoor, Kerala, India. The primary deity is Kodungooramma. It is estimated to be over 200 years old. It initially belonged to Madathil family and was later taken over by the Travancore Devaswom Board.
