= Labour India Gurukulam Public School =

Labour India Public School
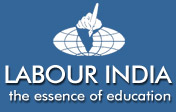

Location
- Labour India Hills; Marangattupilly; India; 9.7423°N 76.5984°E

Information
- Type: Public
- Motto: Together we labour, together we learn
- Established: 1993; 33 years ago
- School district: Kottayam
- Principal: Suja K. George
- Head of school: V. J. George Kulangara
- Staff: 30
- Faculty: 80
- Key people: V. J. George Kulangra (Chairman); Santhosh George Kulangara (Vice Chairman); Rajesh George Kulangara (Managing Director)
- Grades: Pre-Kindergarten to Junior College
- Enrollment: 1200
- Colours: Red, Blue, Green, Yellow
- Athletics: Football, cricket, 400 metres track
- Affiliation: CBSE
- Website: www.gurukulam.com

Labour India Public School is a residential school in Marangattupilly, Kerala, India. It offers classes from pre-Kindergarten to Junior College. The school system integrates a sports schedule and community service. It is affiliated with the Central Board of Secondary Education (CBSE), New Delhi. Other Institutions : Labour India Arts & Science College (Affiliated by MG University, Kottayam) – BA, BSc, BCom., Labour India College of Teacher Education (Affiliated to MG University) – BEd, MEd., National Institute of Open Schooling (NIOS). The School has been ranked in the top 5 in Kerala, and as high as 106 in India by Education World in 2021. The school also holds the National Record for the most CBSE Athletics Meet Championship titles winning 14 out of 22 editions hosted.

== History ==
The Gurukulam is a Sanskrit word and is an ancient Indian system of teaching derived from Vedic traditions. In this system of learning, a student lives with the teacher, who in addition to teaching them, guides them through their daily life. Labour India Gurukulam Public School and Junior College was founded by V. J. George Kulangara in 1993. It is owned by the registered Labour India Educational Society and is located in hilly terrain, recently renamed as Labour India Hills in Marangattupilly village.

== Curriculum ==
The syllabus is based on the Central Board of Secondary Education (CBSE), New Delhi and the text books are as prescribed by the National Council of Educational Research and Training (NCERT). The medium of instruction is English. However, a three-language method is adopted in all classes, to enable students to be functionally multilingual.

== Notable alumni ==
- Liksy Joseph - International Athlete, Silver Medalist in Women's Heptathlon at 2015 Asian Athletics Championships
- Maqbool Salmaan - Indian Actor, Lead role in Matinee (2012 film)
- Arun Kurian - Indian Actor, Lead role in Aanandam
