= Kadaplamattom =

- village
- Location in Kerala, India Kadaplamattom (India)
- Coordinates: 9°42′0″N 76°36′0″E
- Country: India
- State: Kerala
- District: Kottayam

Languages
  - Official: Malayalam, English
- Time zone: UTC+5:30 (IST)
- PIN: 686571
- Vehicle registration: KL-67 (Uzhavoor)
- Nearest city: Palai

Kadaplamattom is a small village near Palai, Kottayam District, Kerala, India. It is a largely agrarian community, with most of the population having agricultural roles within it. The main crops produced are rubber, coconut, plantain, pepper, and ginger.

== Demographics ==
The culture of Kadaplamattom is influenced mainly by the large presence of the Syrian Christian community and Hindu community.

== Sports and Games ==
Football, volleyball and Cricket are among the most popular sports in Kadaplamattom. Kadaplamattom has many sevens football clubs and they are very popular in Kerala.

== NPO.s ==
Junior Chamber International Kadaplamattom Blues Central (JCI Kadaplamattom Blues Central) is the first international organization in Kadaplamattom.

== Religion ==
- Vazhappillikkavu Temple at Elackad where we worship Kavilamma. The idol was found around 25 years back while ploughing the paddy fields.
- St. Mary’s Church Kadaplamattom Diocese of Palai is Located in the backdrop of kidangoor and Elackadu villages in Kottayam district. Spread over Kadaplamattom, Kidangoor and Marangattupilly panchayats, the Kadaplamattam parish serves the area. The Church dates from the 10th Century.
- St. George's Church Vayala Diocese of Palai is situated on the Kottayam - Pala Road (via Vempally, Vayala, Kadaplamattom) 100 meters from Vayala Market Junction. This hundred-year-old church's patron is St. George. It has a chapel at Puthenangady (Vayala East) junction and a shrine dedicated to St. Joseph.
- Joseph Kuttentharappel, of the Ayyankanal branch of the Vattakandathil family and born to Kuttantharappel Kuriakose and Venmena, he was ordained as a priest on 26 December 1915. He started his pastoral service as assistant vicar of Kadaplamattom parish. He also served the parishes of Chirakadavu and Bharananganam as assistant vicar, and served as vicar at many parishes in Palai diocese, including Narianganam, Vettimukal, Mattakara, Kothanalloor, Aikkarachira, Thuruthy, Paingalam, Narively, Palayam, Kodalloor, Maragattupilly, Kudakkachira, Elikkulam, Mutholapuram, Poonjar and Thuruthipally. His service to Kadaplamattom church is hard to pin down. He died on 7 September 1957.
- Symphorian Keepurathu was the first Bishop of Jalandhar Diocese, belongs to Kadaplamattom parish. On superannuating as Bishop of the diocese, he was titled as Bishop Emeritus and died on 03-May-2015.
- Bishop Mathew Anikkuzhikattil, born on 23 September 1942 to Shri. Luka and Aley of Anikkuzhikattil family. He was ordained in 1971. Holder of Doctorate Degree in Liturgy from Louvain Catholic University, Belgium, Mathew Anikuzhikattil became the Bishop of the newly formed Idukki Diocese in 2001. He also became the chairman of the K.C.B.C. Family commission.
