= Vayala =

- Village
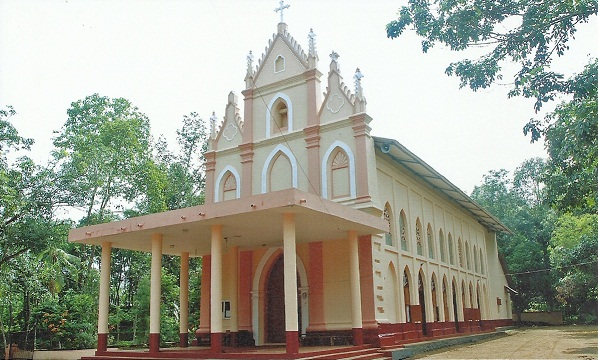
- St.George Church
- Interactive map of Vayala
- Coordinates: 9°43′0″N 76°35′30″E
- Country: India
- State: Kerala
- District: Kottayam

Government
  - Type: 4

Languages
  - Official: Malayalam, English
- Time zone: UTC+5:30 (IST)
- Postal Code: 686 587
- Telephone code: +91 4822
- Vehicle registration: KL-67
- Nearest city: Pala
- Lok Sabha constituency: Kottayam

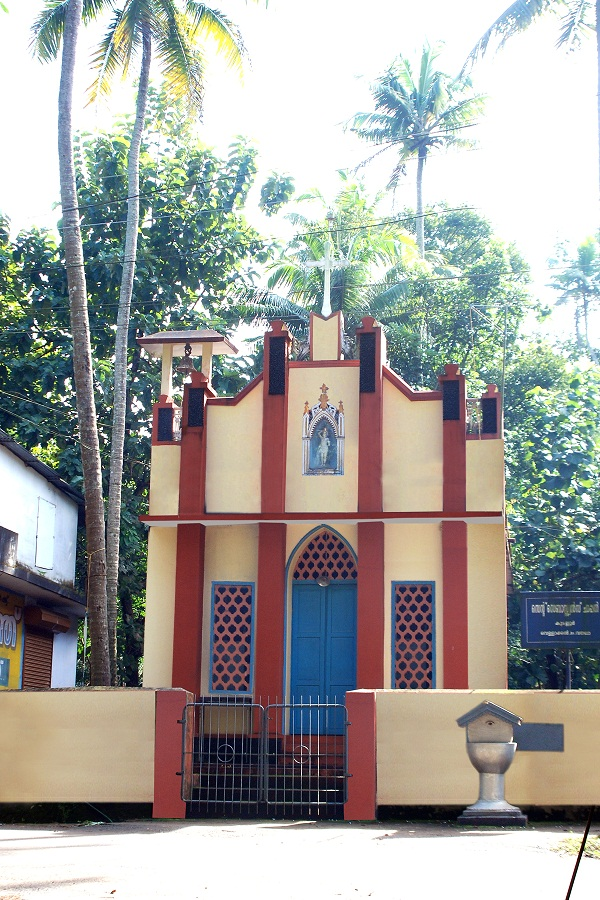
St.Sebastian Chapel

Vayala is a village located in the Meenachil (Pala) Taluk of Kottayam district, Kerala, India. It is approximately 5 kilometers from the village Kuravilangad, about 11 kilometers from Pala municipality town and about 24 kilometers away from district capital Kottayam.

== History ==
It is believed that the name Vayala is derived from the Malayalam word vayal meaning "paddy field".

== Transportation network ==
Vayala is connected with the district headquarters Kottayam and other major cities. Public transport in the town is largely dependent on buses, run by private operators.

== Schools ==
- Govt:V H S S Vayala

== Churches & temples ==
Vayala is located 10 km from Ettumanoor town and 6 km from Kuravilangdu Town. Vayala has four Hindu temples (Paruthurthikavu, Njaralappuzha Sree Dharma Sastha Temple, Thrikkayil Sree Subrahmanya Swami Temple, SNDP Balasubrahmaanya kshetram) and a Roman Catholic church Syrian church (St. George Church, Vayala), a Catholic Latin church (St. Marys Church, Vayala-Puthenangady), three Catholic Syrian chapels: St Joseph (Puthenangady, Vayala), St Xavier (Saviour Giri, Vayala), St Sebastian chapel (Thuruthimukku, Vayala), and a Sacred Heart Convent.

== Hospitals ==
Sacred Heart Catholic Nuns operated St. George Mount Hospital, is the only Allopathic Hospital Facility available with Vayala. Also Vayala has a Govt. Veterinary Hospital, Govt. Ayurvedic Hospital and two private operated Ayurvedic Hospitals (Vedasudha and Omsree).
