= Thottuva Dhanwanthari Temple =

Hindu temple in Kerala, India

Thottuva Dhanwanthari temple
- തോട്ടുവ ധന്വന്തരി ക്ഷേത്രം
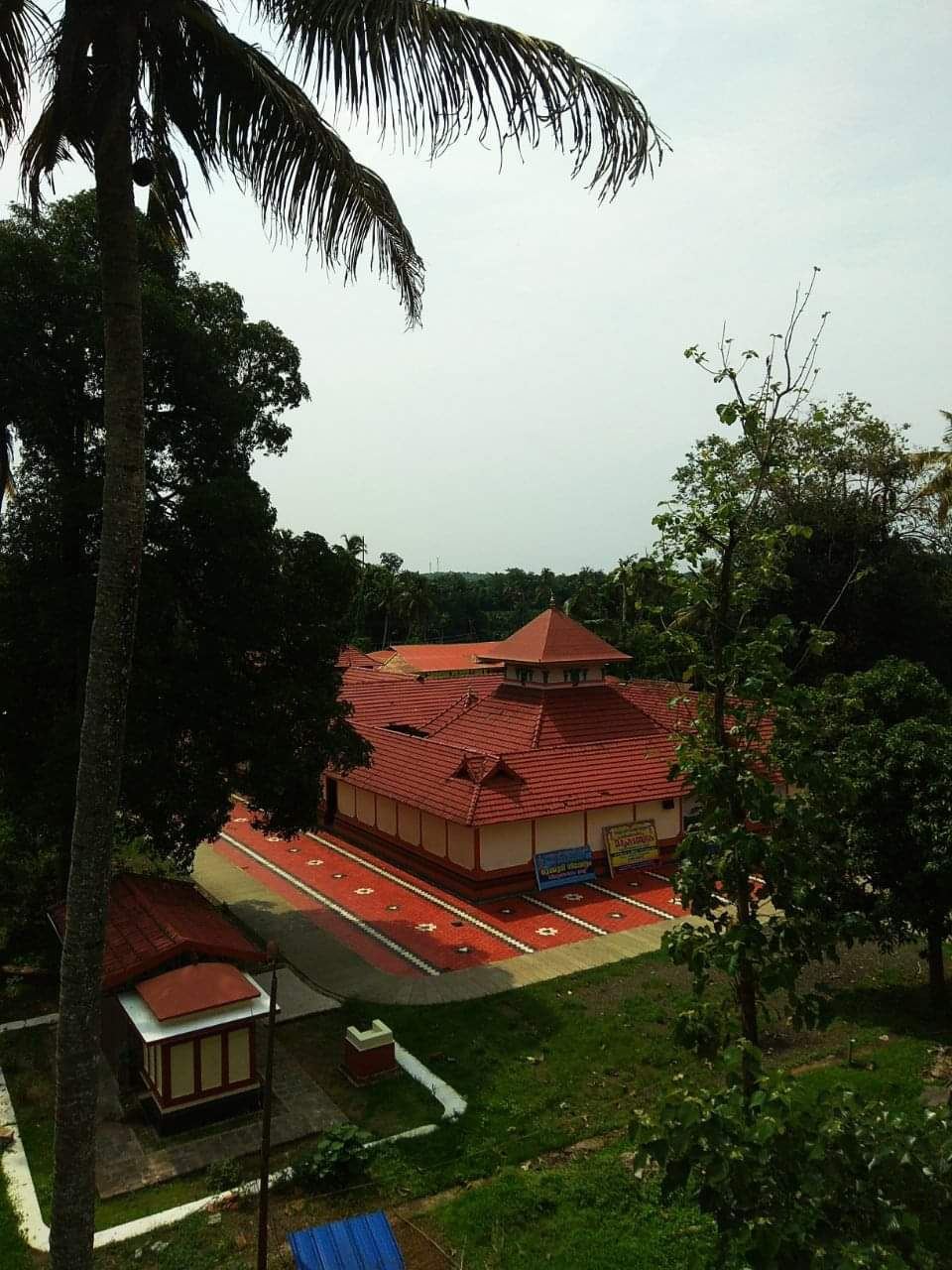
- Thottuva Dhanwanthari temple

- Dhanvantari Temple, Thottuva, Ernakulam, Kerala

Religion
- Affiliation: Hinduism
- District: Ernakulam
- Deity: Dhanwantari

Location
- Location: Thottuva
- State: Kerala
- Country: India
- Interactive map of Thottuva Dhanwanthari temple
- Coordinates: 10.178669°N 76.493101°E

Specifications
- Temple: One
- Elevation: 38.57 m (127 ft)

Website
- http://www.dhanwantharitemple.com/

Thottuva Dhanwanthari temple is a Hindu temple located in Thottuva, Kerala, India.

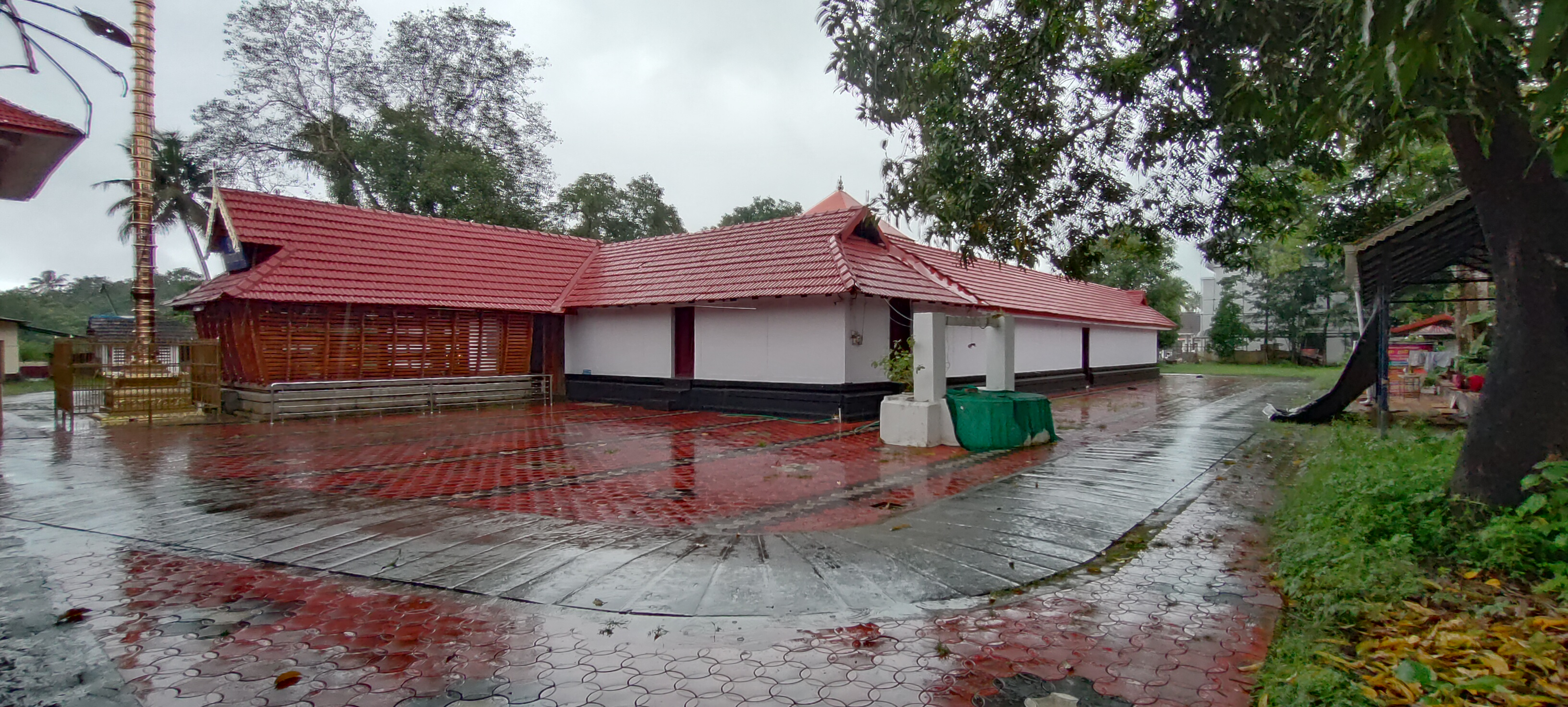
Dhawnathari Temple

Thottuva temple is situated on the Perumbavoor- Kodanad route, at about one kilometre away from Thottuva junction in Koovapady panchayat at Ernakulam district. Devotees can also reach the temple via Kalady - Malayattoor route from the Thottuva junction boat jetty. The presiding deity is Dhanwanthiri and the idol is almost six feet tall and facing east. On the right hand the lord holds Amrith and with the left hand the lord holds Atta, Shanku and Chakra. Sub deities are Ayyappan, Ganapathy, Bhadrakali and Rakshasas. Fresh un-boiled milk is offered here, the important offering is butter. Festivals are conducted on Ekadashi during the Malayalam month of Vrischikam, and on the Pooyam star day during the month of Medam, which is the consecration day. The temple belongs to Koramboor Mana family. The temple is run by Sree Dhanwanthari Moorthi Seva Trust. On the southern side of the temple there is a small stream which flows towards the east. The practice is to have bath in this stream and then enter the temple for Darshan. It is believed that problems due to Vatha, Pitha and Kafa get cured if the devotees stay here and meditate. Doctors practicing Ayurveda also come to the temple for Bhajana (Pooja, meditation). 'Krishna Tulasi' is the favourite of Dhanwanthari. From 'Dhanu' 1st to 11th the Lord is decorated in the Dasavatara forms. There is a legend regarding this 'Dasavataram chartal'. A member of the Korampur Mana Namboothiri did not have any children. He prayed to Lord Dhanwanthiri that he would decorate the Lord in ten different forms if he gets a child. Within a year he was blessed with a child. From that time onwards this practice of decorating the Lord every year in ten different forms, from Dhanu 1st to 11th has been continuing. Many devotees have been performing this offering in the temple for begetting progeny.

== History ==
The main deity is Adi Dhanwanthari, and this is the only temple in Kerala where it is so. It is declared that this temple is more than 1000 years ancient. The legend is that several years ago three Namboodiri families living in the hills of Malayatoor were closely related to this temple. These families has Shiva, Bhagawathy and Vishnu as their family deities. In those days Sankaracharya happened to visit these Namboodiri families. He was not offered food or alms. This made him unhappy and so there was a curse on these families. The family was ruined and so they left the place and traveled to a place called 'Kodanad'. When they felt hungry, they prepared food in three different pots. They used bamboo as firewood for cooking. Two of them lighted the bamboo turning upwards and one turned it downwards. The two Brahmins who had lighted the bamboo by keeping it upwards were able to cook the food very quickly and they continued their journey. All the places through which they travailed became their own. The other Brahmin was unable to cook the food soon because he had lighted the bamboo turning it downwards. Since he was late, he started his journey slowly therefore he did not get any property. Feeling very unhappy he reached the place where at present the temple is situated. Keeping his umbrella (Olakuda) on the ground he began preparing 'Nivedyam' for the evening Pooja. After having food, feeling mentally upset, he went to sleep and the Namboodiri heard the Divine voice of Lord Dhanwanthari telling him not to worry and that he will be able to manage with His Devotees. The place where the Namboodiri had kept his palm leaf umbrella came to be known as 'Kudappadom'.

== Festivals ==
1. Mandala Masam (Ekadashi Maholsavam)
2. Dashavathara Maholsavam
3. Pradhishta Dhinam

== Upadevas ==
Ganapathy
Ayyappan
Bhagavathi
Nagaraja
Nagayakshi
Rakshassu
Bhramarakshassu
