= Kodungoor =

Kodungoor Kudathangiya oor
- town
- Location in Kerala, India Kodungoor (India)
- Coordinates: 9°33′0″N 76°42′0″E
- Country: India
- State: Kerala
- District: Kottayam

Languages
  - Official: Malayalam, English
- Time zone: UTC+5:30 (IST)
- PIN: 686504
- Telephone code: 0481
- Vehicle registration: KL-33
- Nearest cities: Kottayam, Pala
- Lok Sabha constituency: Pathanamthitta

Kodungoor is a town in Kottayam District, Kerala, India. It is the site of the Kodungoor Devi Temple.
