= Palackattumala =

Palackattumala Palakkattumala
- village
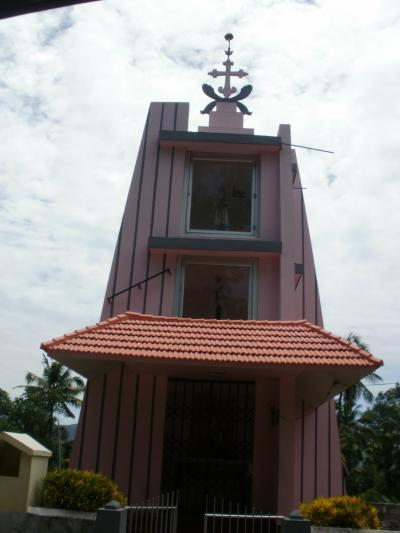
- Kurishu Pally

- Location in Kerala, India
- Coordinates: 9°45′05″N 76°38′04″E
- Country: India
- State: Kerala
- District: Kottayam

Government
  - Body: Marangattupilly Panchayath
- Elevation: 75 m (246 ft)

Population
  - Total: 1,500
  - Density: 565/km^{2} (1,460/sq mi)

Languages
  - Official: Malayalam, English
- Time zone: UTC+5:30 (IST)
- PIN: 686635
- Telephone code: +91-482-2-25xxxx
- Vehicle registration: KL-67 (KL-35, KL-5)
- Nearest city: Pala
- Sex ratio: 1000/992 ♂/♀
- Literacy: 96%
- Lok Sabha constituency: Kottayam
- Civic agency: Marangattupilly Panchayath
- Climate: Tropical (Köppen)

Palackattumala is a village in Kottayam District of Kerala, India with a population of around 1500. An oblong tableland located on a small rolling hill, north of Illickal Junction in Pala – Vaikom road. The nearest town is Palai.

== Postal Information ==
PIN Code: 686635

Post Office Name: Palackattumala BO

Office Type: Branch Post Office (Delivery Office)

Location: Meenachil Taluk, Kottayam District, Kerala State

Departmental Information: Under Marangattupally Sub Office, Kottayam Division, Kochi Region, Kerala Circle

== Economy ==
People in this village depend on agriculture, with rubber, coconut, cocoa, pepper, tamarind, ginger, tapioca, pineapple, and banana being the main crops. Other spices include clove, vanilla and nutmeg. Also in abundance are papaya, jackfruit, mango trees, and arrowroot.

== Local administration ==
Palackattumala is divided into two Gram-panchayath wards. wards V-Irumugham and VI-Palackattumala, of Marangattupilly Gram Panchayat. For the previous term September 2015 – 2020 both these wards are represented by Martin Augustine and Mathukutty George respectively. Currently both these wards (September 2010–2015 and again in 2020–2025) were reserved for women and are/were represented by Praseeda Sajeev, mother of the great Abhiram (Apoose) and Nirmala Divakaran respectively. Palackattumala is part of Marangattupilly ward in Uzhavoor Block Panchayat. For revenue administration purpose Palackattumala is under Kurichithanam revenue village and belongs to Meenachil Thaluk. Palackattumala is part of Kaduthuruthy Legislative Constituency and Kottayam Lok-Sabha Constituency.

== Transportation ==
The Illickal-Palackattumala-Kudakkachira road passes through Palackattumala. Other major roads are Valavoor-Palackattumala Kurisupally Junction road, and Palackattumala-Andoor Road. Apart from that there are few minor roads to reach different places in Palackattumala.
