= Lakkattoor =

Village in Kottayam District, Kerala, India

Coordinates: 9.62461°N 76.65032°E

Lakkattoor is a small village in Kooroppada panchayat, about 17 km east of Kottayam, Kerala located between Kottayam, Ettumanoor, Pala and Ponkunnam. Surrounded by small hills, valleys, streams and rubber trees. Lakkattoor is a unique name. It is believed that the name might have changed from 'Plakkattoor', because the area has lot of jackfruit trees known as 'Plavu' (Artocarpus heterophyllus Lam). Jackfruit is also known as 'Plakka'.

Educational institutions in this village: MGM NSS College, MGM NSS Higher Secondary School, Cluny Public School, Cheppumpara.

K. R. Narayanan National Institute of Visual Science and Arts is located few kilometers from the heart of Lakkattoor.
