= Indian Institute of Information Technology, Kottayam =

Autonomous engineering institute in Valavoor, Palai, Kottayam District, Kerala, India

- Motto: Generating knowledge for tomorrow
- Type: Public–private partnership
- Established: 2015; 11 years ago
- Director: Prof. Prasad Krishna (Additional Charge)
- Location: Kottayam, Kerala, India; 9.754833°N 76.650099°E
- Campus: Suburban (53.5 acres)
- Website: www.iiitkottayam.ac.in

Indian Institute of Information Technology, Kottayam (abbreviated IIIT Kottayam or IIITK) is an autonomous engineering Institute located at Valavoor, Palai, Kottayam District, Kerala. It is one of the Indian Institute of Information Technology institutes established by the Ministry of Human Resource Development, Government of India under Public-private partnership mode It is operated on a PPP model and funded by Government of India (50%), Government of Kerala (35%) and Industry Partners (15%) namely CIAL and Rolta Foundation.

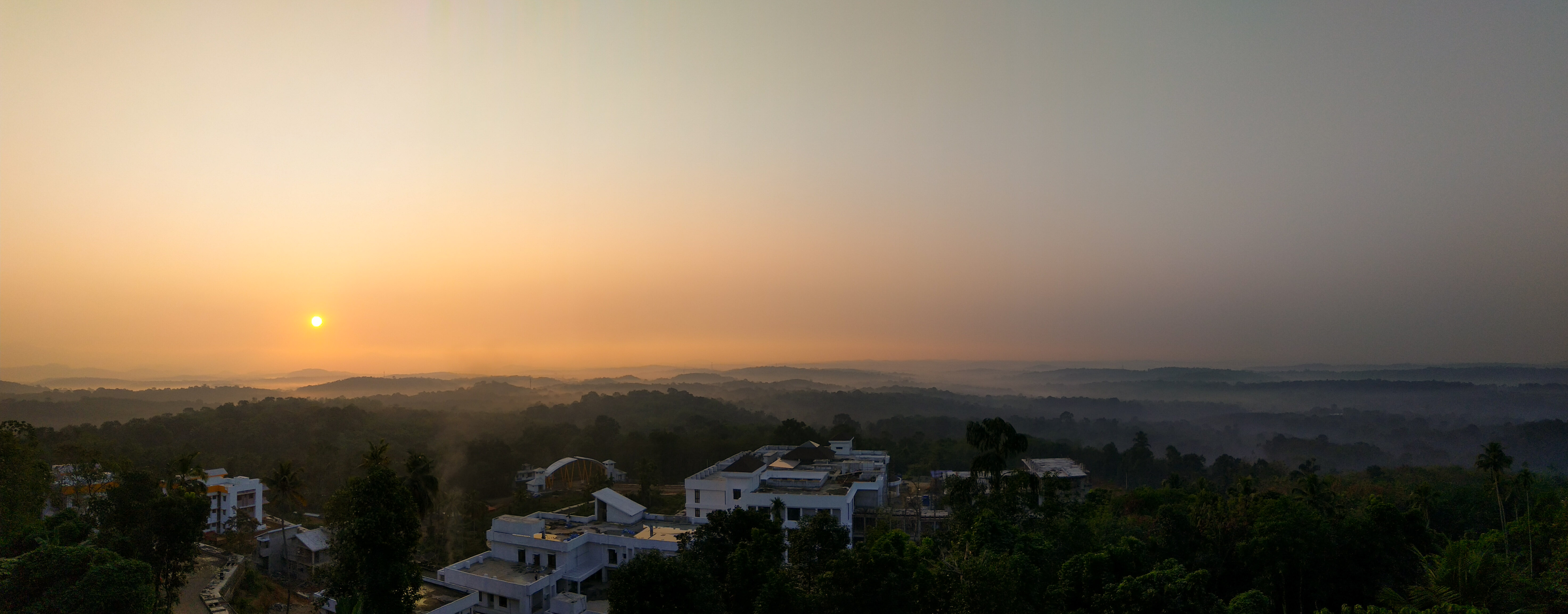
Campus of IIIT Kottayam at Valavoor, Kerala.

== History ==
IIIT Kottayam was founded in 2015. In 2017, IIITK was declared as an Institute of National Importance by IIIT PPP Bill 2017.

IIITK started its functioning in June, 2015 in Amal Jyothi College of Engineering, Kerala as its temporary campus under the mentorship of NIT Calicut. In December 2016, the mentorship of IIITK has been moved to IISER Thiruvananthapuram and the transit campus was shifted to Gulati Institute of Finance and Taxation (GIFT) campus at Thiruvananthapuram. IIITK started functioning in its permanent campus which was officially inaugurated by Shri Prakash Javadekar, the Human Resource Minister on 20 February 2019 through video conferencing.

The first mentor director of the institute was Sivaji Chakravorti, director of NIT Calicut. After the transfer of mentorship to IISER-TVM, Prof. V. Ramakrishnan became the mentor director of IIIT Kottayam. From March 2019 to October 2024, Dr. Rajiv V. Dharaskar served as the permanent director of the institute. In October 2024 Prof. Prasad Krishna, director of NIT Calicut, took additional charge as Director of the institute. M. Radhakrishnan is the registrar of the institute.

== Campus ==
The IIIT Kottayam's permanent campus is located at Valavoor, Pala, Kottayam district, Kerala. The work for development of the permanent campus is entrusted to CPWD, GoI. The campus is designed to be environment friendly and green with the provision for solar and wind energy.

The campus is located between two cities Thiruvananthapuram and Kochi. The nearest means of Transport available are as follows:

- Nearest Railway station - Kottayam Railway Station (33 km from the main campus).
- Airport - Cochin International Airport (COK) (67 km).
- Nearby bus stand - Valavoor bus stand (1.3 km).

== Academic ==
IIITK at present offers B.Tech, M.S dual degree programs in Computer Science and Engineering (Core), Computer Science and Engineering with specialization in Artificial Intelligence & Data Science, Computer Science & Engineering with specialization in Cyber Security and Electronics & Communication Engineering. The institute also offers M.Tech Degrees in Artificial Intelligence & Data Science, Cyber security and Big Data & Machine Learning. It also offers Ph.D courses in the Computer Science and Electronics.

The admission to B.Tech. programs is based on the performance of Joint Entrance Exam (JEE MAINS) and HSC Examinations as per Central Board of Secondary Education (CBSE) guidelines. The number of seats available for admission, is decided by Academic Advisory Committee/Senate, which at present is 556 (all branches combined).

== Student life ==
=== Student clubs ===
IIITK comprises four clubs:

- betaLABS - The Coding club of IIITK focuses on providing the platform for discussion and sharing of information among peers. Students are updated with the contemporary works of research and technology through group discussions, seminars, and other activities throughout the week.
- WildBeats - The Cultural club of IIITK organizes various cultural festivals throughout the year.
- Sportec - The sports club of IIITK encourages students to develop their sports skills and aims to bring sportsmanship among students. Organizes various sports events comprises various track & field events, indoor-outdoor games. Its also organizes the annual sports meet "Pradhva".
- Trendles club - The social club of the IIITK aims to bring social awareness among students. Organizes various social awareness campaign such as Swachh Bharat etc. It also provides opportunities to the students to develop their photography and literary skills. Its also maintains the social platform of the institute for global outreach.
- Elix - Technical Club of ECE
- Cyber Security Club IIIT Kottayam
- Enigma - AI/ML Club

== See also ==
- List of engineering colleges in Kerala
