= Beena Kannan =

Indian business woman

- Born: 17 July 1960 (age 65); Kottayam, Kerala, India

Beena Kannan is an Indian businesswoman, who is the CEO and lead designer of Seematti textiles.

== Career ==
After graduation, she joined the family textile retailing business Seematti in 1980, working with her father and husband. Seematti was started by her grandfather Veeriah Reddiar.

Beena received attention when the longest ever silk sari created by her (500m) entered the Guinness Book of Records and Limca Book of Records in 2007.

Her rapport with the weaving communities earned for her a "Lifetime Achievement Award" from Coimbatore Erode Weaving community in 2009. In September 2011, Beena Kannan-designed saris walked the "Swarovski Elements 2011" Ramp.
