= Thottuva =

- Village
- Location in Kerala, India Thottuva (India)
- Coordinates: 10°9′0″N 76°28′45.10″E
- Country: India
- State: Kerala
- District: Ernakulam
- Talukas: Kunnathunadu

Languages
  - Official: Malayalam, English
- Time zone: UTC+5:30 (IST)
- PIN: 683544
- Telephone code: 0484
- Vehicle registration: KL-40
- Vidhan Sabha constituency: Perumbavoor

Thottuva is a village in Ernakulam District, Kerala, India. It lies on the banks of Periyar River near Kalady. The name Thottuva in Malayalam means "mouth of the stream". There is a small stream which joins the Periyar there.

Thottuva is 40 kilometres (25 mi) from the city of Kochi and 15 kilometres (9.3 mi) from Cochin International Airport. The nearest railway station is Angamali (also 15 km).

== Landmarks ==
- Thottuva Dhanwanthari temple
- St.Joseph's Church
