= Kappumthala =

- Village
- Interactive map of Kappumthala
- Coordinates: 9°45′38″N 76°31′32″E
- Country: India
- State: Kerala
- District: Kottayam

Kappumthala is a village in Kottayam district in the state of Kerala, India.

The nearest railway station is at Kuruppanthara and Vaikom road.

26 kilometers from Kottayam and 48 kilometers from Ernakulam.
