= Kuravilangad =

- Town
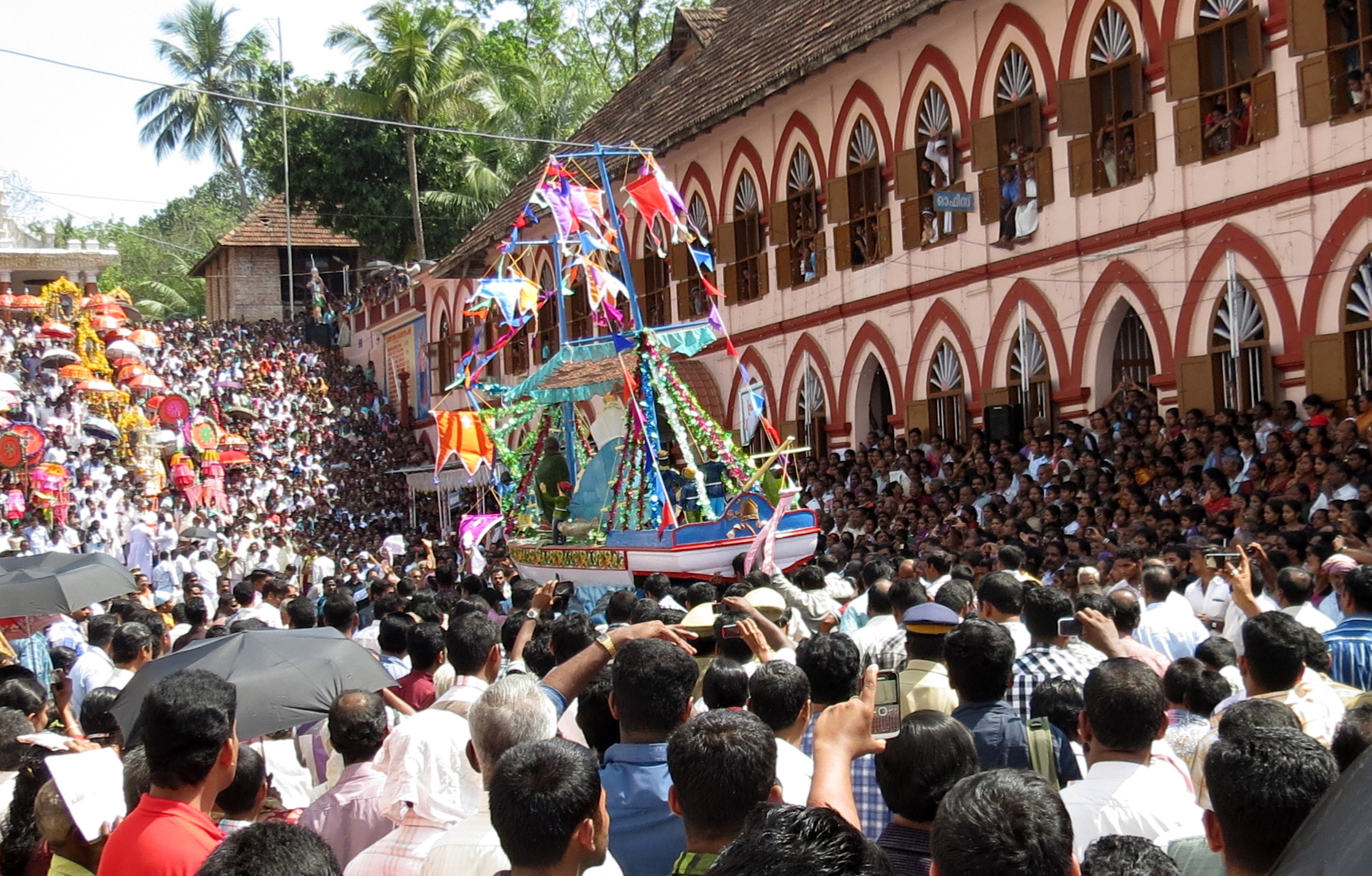
- Kuravilangad Kappalottam festival

- Location in Kerala, India Kuravilangad (India)
- Coordinates: 9°45′0″N 76°33′0″E
- Country: India
- State: Kerala
- District: Kottayam

Government
  - Type: Panchayath
  - Body: Village

Languages
  - Official: Malayalam, English
- Time zone: UTC+5:30 (IST)
- PIN: 686633
- Telephone code: 04822
- Vehicle registration: KL-67
- Nearest city: Kottayam, Muvattupuzha, Pala, Thodupuzha
- Literacy: 99.12%
- Lok Sabha constituency: Kottayam

Kuravilangad is an Indian town located in the northern part of the Kottayam district in Kerala. It is situated in the Meenachil taluk, about 22 km north of the district capital Kottayam and 17 km west of the municipal town Pala.

Kuravilangad is the largest town on the northern side of the Kottayam district. It includes the entire Kuravilangad panchayat, including Thottuva, Kappumthala, Vakkad, Kurianad, Mannakkanad, Elakkad, and Kalathoor.

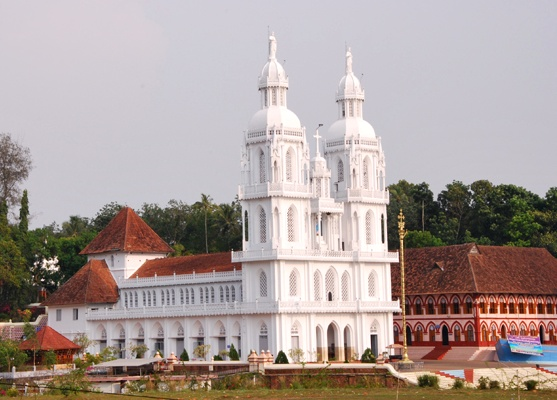
St Mary's Syro Malabar Church, Kuravilangad

Kuravilangad is known for the Marian pilgrim center, St. Mary's Syro-Malabar Major Archepiscopal Church, founded in 105 AD according to tradition, and the Kozha Sree Narasimhaswami Temple.

== Education ==
Kuravilangad is the local hub of education, catering to students from both Kottayam and Ernakulam District. Notable educational institutes include Deva Matha College, Kuravilangad St Marys's HS, St. Anne's HSS, De Paul HSS, Chavara Hills High School, and St. Marys Girls High School.
