= Sancharam (TV series) =

Indian travel documentary

- Logo
- Created by: Santhosh George Kulangara
- Presented by: Santhosh George Kulangara
- Narrated by: Anish Punnen Peter
- Country of origin: India
- Original language: Malayalam
- No. of episodes: 2100

Production
- Producer: Santhosh George Kulangara
- Running time: 30 minutes

Original release
- Network: Asianet
- Release: 2001 – 2013
- Network: Safari TV
- Release: 2013 – present

Sancharam (transl. Travel) is an Indian Malayalam-language travel documentary telecast on Safari TV. The program was shot, edited and directed by Santhosh George Kulangara. It airs at 09:30 pm and 10 pm (IST) every weekday and is re-telecast the next day (weekdays only) four times. It originally aired on Asianet on Sundays, and now airs on Safari TV, which is owned by Kulangara. An internet edition of Sancharam is also available free of cost. It is said to be the first internet television in Kerala.

== Awards ==
Old logo

Sancharam has received many awards. Some of the awards include:

- Best TV serial award
- Vivekananda Awards
- Limca Book of Records, added in its 2007 edition
- Kerala's Film Critics Award: for the best Television program telecasted in 2005.
- Souparnikatheeram State Award: Television Award for the best director of a non-fictional program.
- All India RAPA Award-2004: award of 'best non-fiction television program' given away by Radio and TV Advertising Practitioners Association (RAPA)
- National Film Academy Award: program has been declared eligible for the award instituted by National Film Academy for the section 'Other than Fiction'
- Kerala Film Critics Association Award-2003
- All India Akshaya National Award-2003
- National Award: This is one of the awards given at National level in the Radio-Mini screen field. This program selected for the award from the TV programs of about 20 different languages.
