= Santhosh George Kulangara =

Indian traveller and media personality

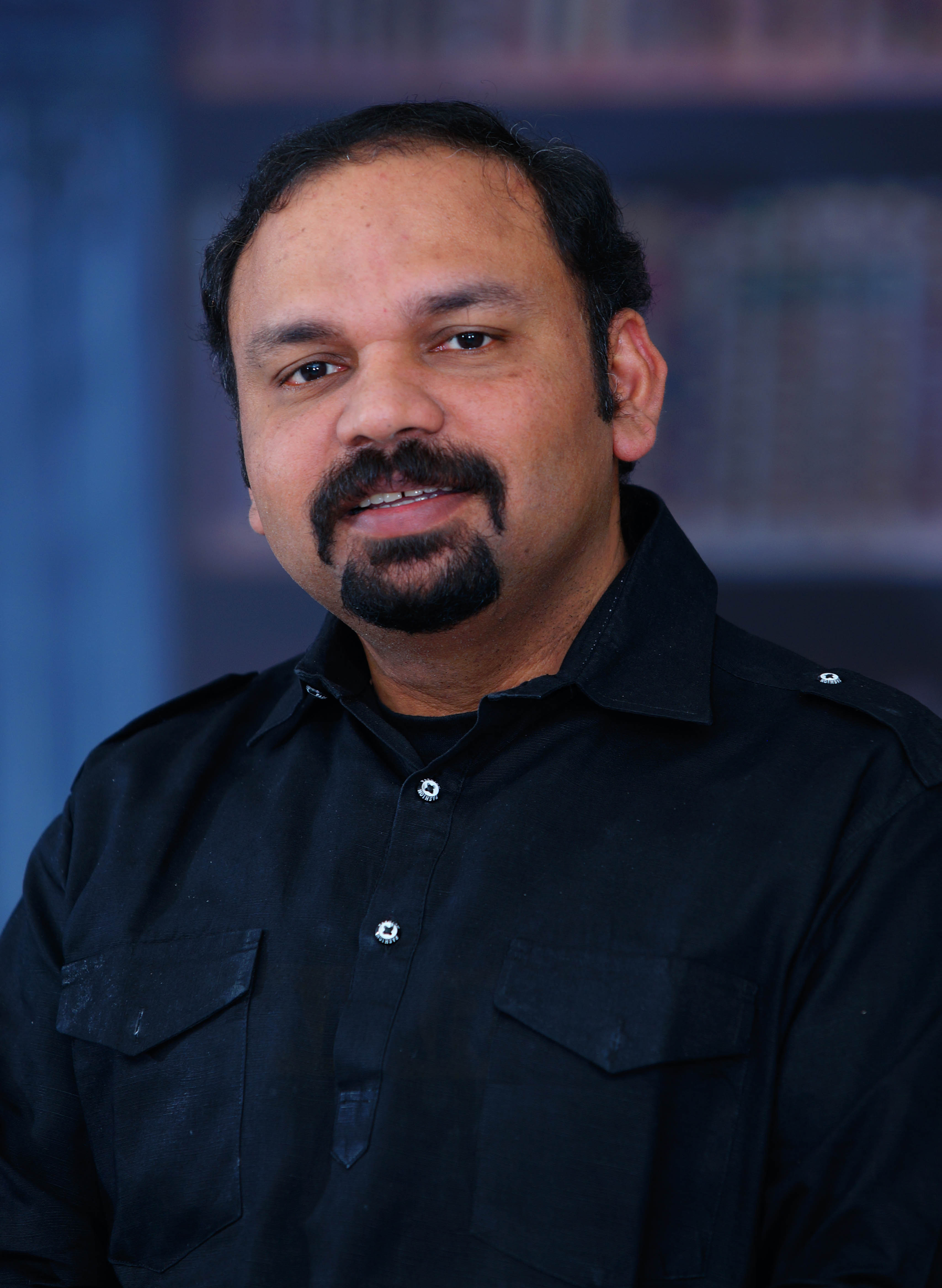
- Born: Santhosh George Kulangara; 25 December 1971 (age 54); Marangattupilly, Kottayam district, Kerala, India
- Other name: SGK
- Education: Madurai Kamaraj University
- Occupations: Traveller; producer; director; broadcaster; editor; publisher
- Years active: 1992 – present (TV)
- Organization(s): Labour India; Safari TV
- Known for: Travel documentaries
- Spouse: Soncy
- Children: 2
- Awards: Kerala Sahitya Akademi Award

Santhosh George Kulangara (born; 25 December 1971) is an Indian businessman, traveller, television producer, director, broadcaster, editor, and publisher. He is the founder and managing director of Safari TV, a channel dedicated to travel and history-based programmes. Kulangara also serves as the head of Labour India Publications, an educational publisher for school children. As of 2025, Kulangara had reportedly travelled to 151 countries and his journeys have been telecast through Sancharam, the first travel documentary in Malayalam.

== Early life ==
Santhosh was born at Marangattupilly in Kottayam district of Kerala, India on 25 December 1971. After doing his post-graduation in journalism and mass communication from Madurai Kamaraj University.

== Career ==
=== Television ===
Santhosh started a career in journalism in 1992 by making telefilms and documentaries for various television channels. At age 26, he assumed the leadership of Labour India Publications, a publishing house which provides journals and magazines for students. His telefilms and documentaries include Samayam, Acharya, Maluvinte Lokam and Krishnagatha. In 1997, he decided to start a travelogue by travelling to different countries and the first episode of Sancharam was broadcast in Asianet in 2001.

Kulangara launched the exploration channel Safari TV on 1 November 2013 and is its managing director. He is "Chief Explorer" of Safari TV, and the channel's signature programme, Sancharam, is shot, edited and directed by him. It entered the Limca Book of Records as the "first visual travelogue in Malayalam". As a solo traveller, he has visited several nations around the globe to showcase the history, culture traditions and nature of each destination. As of 2025, he had reportedly travelled through 151 countries and seven continents since he started his solo journeys outside India in 1997. The programme was initially telecasted by Asianet channel from 2001 to 2012.

=== Space tourism ===
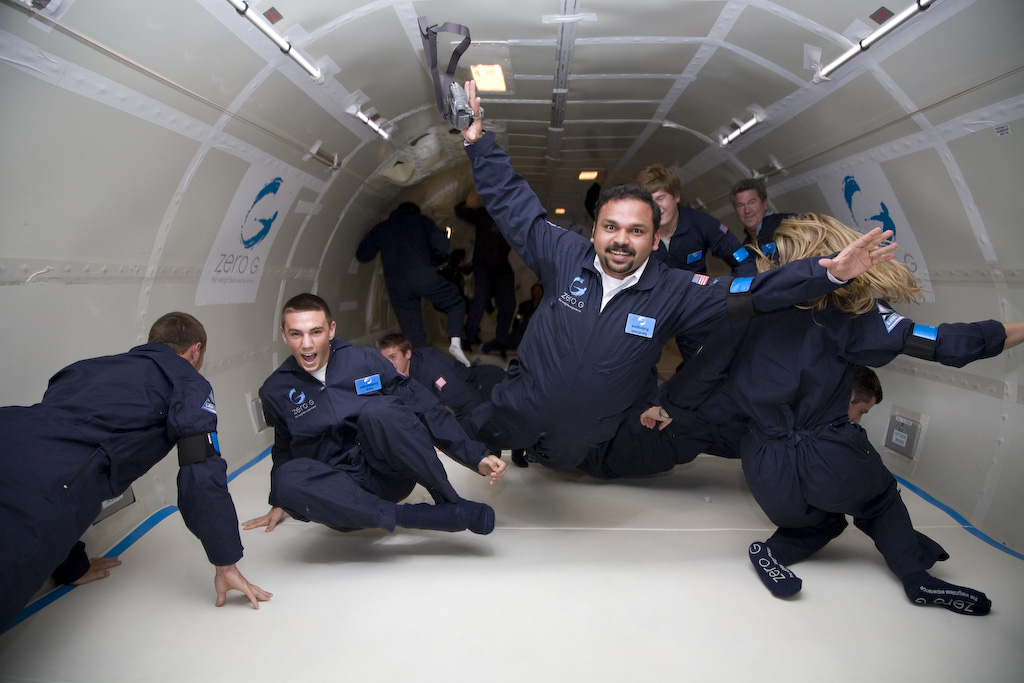
Santhosh George Kulangara on a reduced-gravity aircraft flight with Zero Gravity Corporation in 2007

Described in some outlets as 'India's first space tourist', he was the first Indian included among a group of people who paid to make a suborbital trip in a spaceship as part of the Virgin Galactic space tourism initiative. He was selected for the trip in early 2007, and undertook a "zero gravity experience" later in 2007.

=== Film ===
In 2010, he directed and produced an English film, Chandrayaan, based on Chandrayaan-1, India's first lunar probe. The film features behind-the-scene activities of the mission. The Rocket Assembly Building at Sriharikota, the Rocket Launch Pad, Mission Control Centre, Spacecraft Assembly Building, PSLV Rocket and Chandrayaan spacecraft were all recreated on the sets at Labour India Film and TV Studios. The chief architects, who worked behind the actual Chandrayaan project, are the main characters of the film. The film was released in theatres in 2011.

== Personal life ==
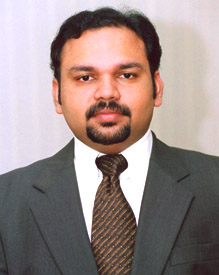
Santhosh George Kulangara in 2007.

He is married to Soncy and has two children. In 2021, he was appointed as a "part-time expert member" of the Kerala State Planning Board.

== Selected awards and honours ==
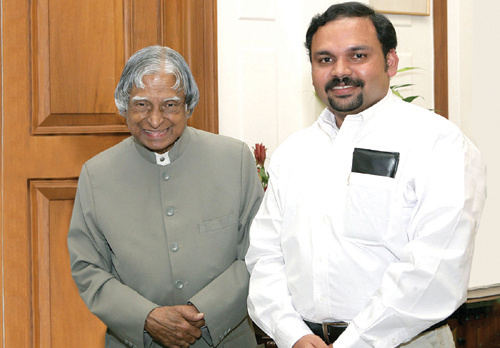
Santhosh with A. P. J. Abdul Kalam, former President of India in 2007

Santhosh George Kulangara has won several awards, including the Kerala Sahitya Academi Award for Best Travelogue (2012), an Asian Television Award, K.R. Narayanan Award (instituted by the K.R. Narayanan Foundation), Kerala Film Critics Award for the best Television programme director, and Yuva Pratibha Award for the year 2004 for his contributions to the field of television by the Indian Junior Chamber. Other awards include the Souparnikatheeram Mini Screen Award for the best director of non-fictional television programmes, Outstanding Young Indian National Award instituted by JCI India, Rotary Star of the Year 2007 award, All India RAPA Award instituted by Radio and TV Advertising Practitioners Association of India, National Film Academy Award, Maniyeri Madhavan award in 2015, Bahumukha Prathibha award at Flowers TV awards 2017 and Kerala Catholic Bishops’ Council (KCBC) media awards for 2020-21.

== Books ==
Santhosh George Kulangara has written seven books related to his travels and experiences around the world. These books are written in Malayalam.

- Natashayude Varna Balloonukal (The Colourful Balloons of Natasha): A travelogue of his journey through parts of Northern Europe in winter.
- Oru Rabbiyude Chumbanangal (The Kisses of a Rabbi): Covering his journey through 50 countries, the people he met and his experiences.
- Ground Zeroyile Gayakan (The Musician at Ground Zero): Describing a journey through the US and Canada, reflecting on life after the 9/11 terror attack.
- Zero Gravity: Describes his experience of zero gravity training in a specially designed aircraft at Kennedy Space Center.
- Baltic Diary: A narrative of his journey through several Baltic countries, focusing on the changes in these countries after the fall of the Soviet Union.
- Keralaism: Thoughts on how to implement 'progressive development concepts' in Kerala.
- Spacilekku oru train yatra (A Train-Journey To Space): Describing the events that led to his decision to become a 'space tourist' and his various travel experiences.
