= Uzhavoor =

- Town
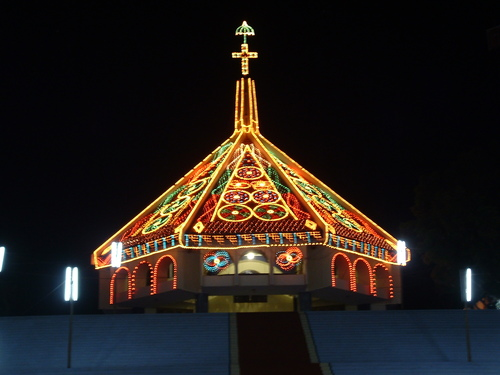
- Interactive map of Uzhavoor
- Coordinates: 9.787314°N 76.610016°E
- Country: India
- State: Kerala
- District: Kottayam

Government
  - Type: Panchayath
  - Body: Uzhavoor Grama Panchayath

Area
  - Total: 25 km^{2} (9.7 sq mi)

Population
  - Total: 15,338
  - Density: 610/km^{2} (1,600/sq mi)

Languages
  - Official: Malayalam, English
- Time zone: UTC+5:30 (IST)
- PIN: 686634
- Vehicle registration: KL-67
- Nearest city: Pala
- Lok Sabha Constituency: Kottayam
- Vidhan Sabha Constituency: Kaduthuruthy
- Literacy: 95%
- Climate: June - September (Rainy); October - January (Winter); February - May (Summer)

Uzhavoor is an expanding town in Kottayam district, Kerala in India. It is just 32 km away from the administrative capital Kottayam District. Most of its residents are either wealthy farmers or businessmen. Many of the houses belong to NRIs. The tenth President of India, K. R. Narayanan, was born and brought up in this village. The newly expanded road which connects the city of Pala and other destinations such as Sabarimala to the city of Muvattupuzha passes through Uzhavoor. The town is 177 km from the state capital Thiruvananthapuram.

== Etymology ==
Since the area was known for its agricultural practices, it is believed that the name Uzhavoor came from two Malayalam words Uzhavu (Ploughing or a word related to agricultural practices) and Ooru (Place or Region). When translated, it means The Land of Agriculture.

== Geography ==
Uzhavoor is a village located in the Kottayam District of Kerala. Uzhavoor is located about 5 km from Kudakkachira, 4 km from Kurichithanam, 6 km from Monipilly, 7 km from Kurianad, 15 km from Pala and 25 km from Thodupuzha. Uzhavoor is known for its St. Stephen's Church, St. Stephen's College, and the Capuchin Monastery. Uzhavoor belongs to the Kaduthuruthy constituency. The area is filled with rubber trees, jack fruit trees, mango trees and coconut trees. Uzhavoor is surrounded by small places like Edakkoly, Poovathumkal, Melareekara and Pius Mount.

== Religion ==
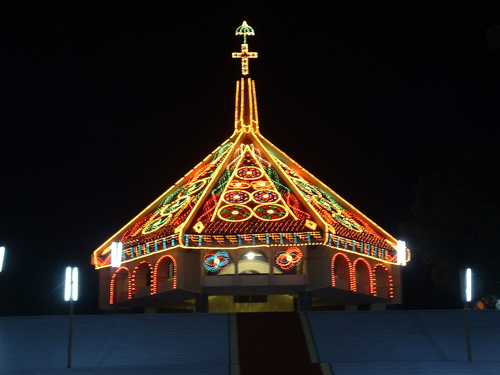
St. Stephen's Church, Uzhavoor

The St. Stephen's Church of Uzhavoor belongs to the Kottayam Arch Diocese of Knanaya Catholic community which was built in 1631. It is a forane church and is the biggest forane under the vast Kottayam Arch Diocese. The people of this village are friendly and hospitable. Karunechi and Sasthamkulam temples are the main Hindu temples in Uzhavoor. The deity of Sasthamthamkulam the deities of Shiva and Parvati is very special that they are present as Kirathamoorthis that is they are present in the hunters form which is a speciality of the temples in Kerala. The majority of the population are members of the Knanaya Catholic community. St. Stephen's Church in Uzhavoor has a grand feast on 8 and 26 December. This is the biggest event in the town and a lot of people take part in this event. The temples also celebrate all major festiviThe people of this village who belong to different religions and communities live here in peace, and harmony. Former President of India K. R. Narayanan, who came from a poor family of this village, remains an inspiration to the people here.

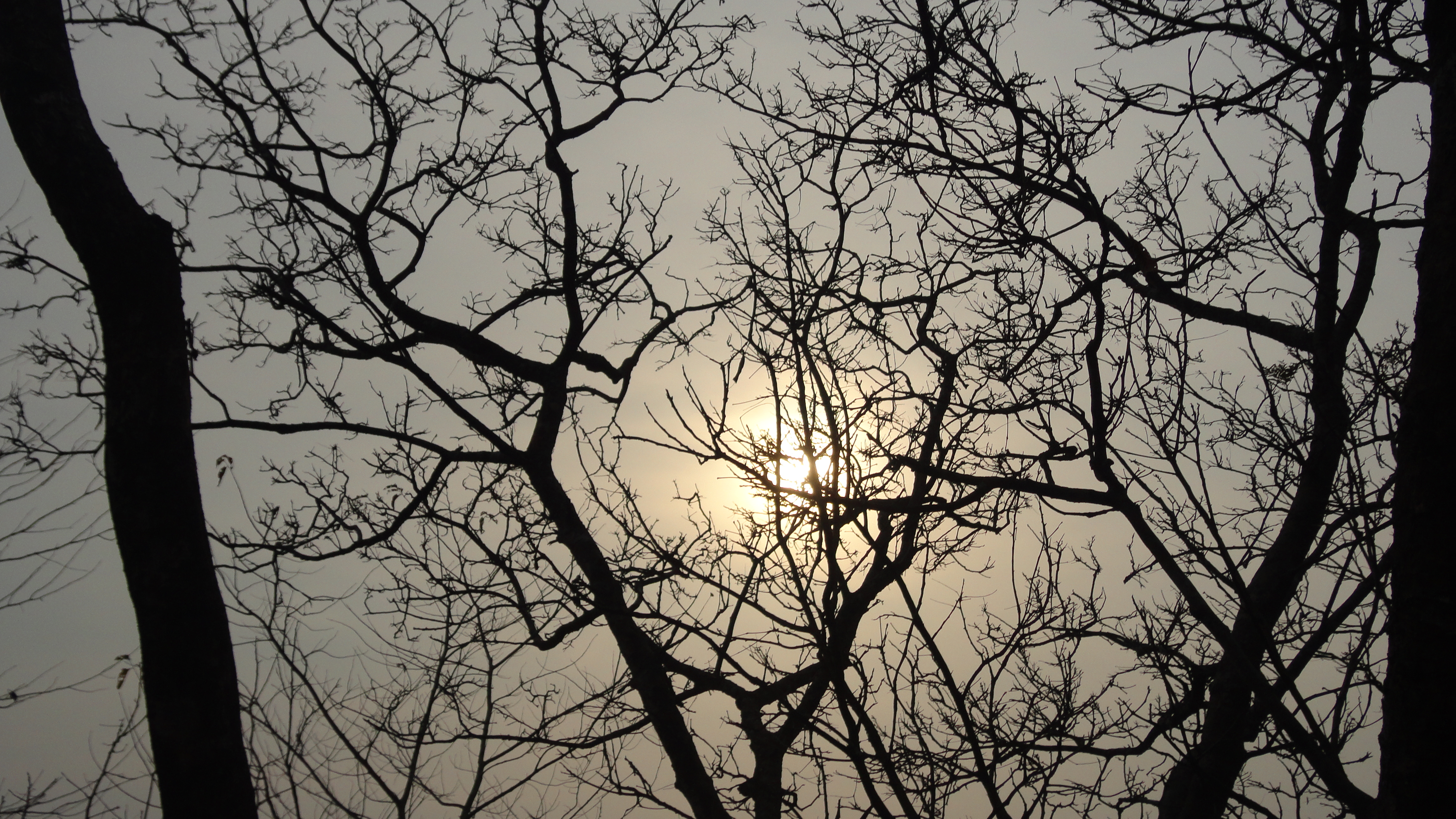
Sunset from top heights of Uzhavoor

== Education ==
The well-known St. Stephen's College is situated here. The educational system of Uzhavoor is enhanced by the Government authorized O.L.L.H.S Schools. Well known CBSE, ICSE & CMI schools are also situated very closely to the town of Uzhavoor. The Mahatma Gandhi University, one of the six universities is just 24 km from the town. The Kottayam Medical College is about 27 km from the town. Uzhavoor is surrounded by self-financed and managed well-known engineering colleges, such as, St. Joseph College of Engineering & Technology, Amal Jyothi College of Engineering, CMS College, BMS College and Mangalam College of Engineering. Several Polytechnic and Nursing colleges are situated nearby. It is neighboured by the well-known K. R. Narayanan National Institute of Visual Science and Arts.

== Transportation network ==
The city of Uzhavoor is connected with the city of Cochin and other major cities with well expanded roads. Uzhavoor is also a major route for Sabarimala. Public transport in the town is largely dependent on buses, run by both private operators and the Kerala State Road Transport Corporation (KSRTC). It is a main bus route to all the major cities. KSRTC bus station is situated in the nearest city of Pala. Cochin International Airport is situated in 60 km from the city.

The nearest railway station is Kottayam (KTYM) railway station which is under the administration of the Southern Railway. It lies on the busy rail route between Thiruvananthapuram and Ernakulam and is served by several long-distance trains connecting most major cities in the country, like New Delhi, Mumbai, Bengaluru, Hyderabad, Kolkata, Chennai and Ahmedabad.

Kottayam Port, India's first multi-modal Inland Container Depot (ICD) and a minor port using inland water way, is situated at Nattakom (near Kodimatha), on the banks of Kothoor river is situated is just 38 km away from the city. The Kerala State Water Transport Department (KSWTD) operates ferry services through the backwaters in and around Kottayam city. Ferries are a major mode of transport to the town connect to the tourist destination of Kumarakom and Alappuzha, as well as several smaller destinations. There are two major ferry jetties in the city - Town Jetty and Kodimatha Jetty. In recent years, the boat jetty at Kumarakom has acquired international fame as a launch point for the backwater rides on Vembabad lake, which has virtually become a poster image for tourism in Kerala.

Besides local bus services for traveling within the town, Kottayam is well-connected to the rest of Kerala through inter-state bus services run by KSRTC. Hired forms of transport include metered taxis and auto-rickshaws. The major port city of Kochi (70 kilometres (43 mi)) can be reached by the well-connected roads from Uzhavoor to Piravom and to Ernakulam

== Climate and weather ==
The climate in this region is moderate and pleasant. Uzhavoor has an average elevation of 4 metres from the sea level. According to the division of places in Kerala based on altitudes, Uzhavoor is classified as being a midland area. The general soil of the area is Alluvial soil. The area is very and well suitable for every type of agriculture and agricultural practices. The vegetation is mainly Tropical Evergreen and Tropical Deciduous type. The area is a main and major gateway to the hilly parts of Kerala and to the Western Ghats. Annual temperatures range between 20 and 35 °C (68 and 95 °F). From June through September, the south-west monsoon brings in heavy rains, as Uzhavoor lies on the windward side of the Western Ghats. From October to December, Uzhavoor receives light rain from the northwest monsoon. The average annual rainfall is 3200 mm. Soon after the monsoon season in the middle of December the winter season starts here with moderately cold up to the mid of February or March. Since the land is very fertile all types of vegetation is possible here and from the onset of April the land bloomed flowers and freshness up to July. The land itself creates naturally for all the cultural fiestas of land in December. The land is climatically very fair, it also helps Babymon to grow rubber crops.

Climate data for Uzhavoor (ഉഴവൂര്)
Month	Jan	Feb	Mar	Apr	May	Jun	Jul	Aug	Sep	Oct	Nov	Dec	Year
Mean daily maximum °C (°F)	33 (91)	33 (91)	34 (93)	34 (93)	33 (91)	31 (88)	30 (86)	30 (86)	31 (88)	31 (88)	31 (88)	32 (90)	32 (89)
Mean daily minimum °C (°F)	23 (73)	22 (72)	26 (79)	26 (79)	26 (79)	25 (77)	24 (75)	25 (77)	25 (77)	25 (77)	25 (77)	24 (75)	25 (76)
Average precipitation mm (inches)	23 (0.9)	40 (1.6)	61 (2.4)	156 (6.1)	321 (12.6)	637 (25.1)	597 (23.5)	398 (15.7)	293 (11.5)	327 (12.9)	211 (8.3)	53 (2.1)	3,117 (122.7)
Average precipitation days (≥ 0.1 mm)	1	3	4	8	11	22	21	18	14	13	9	4	128

== Transport ==
Nearest major stations :

- Bus : Koothattukulam (10 km)
- Bus : Pala (15 km)
- Bus : Thodupuzha(20 km)
- Train : Kottayam, Ernakulam
- Air : Kochi Airport

== Notable people ==
- Kocheril Raman Narayanan (4 February 1921 – 9 November 2005) was the tenth President of India
- E. J. Lukose Ellankil (25 January 1933 – 12 March 2012) represented Ettumannor constituency as in the 7th Kerala Legislative Assembly (1982–1987).
- Sunny Thomas is a former Indian national shooting champion in the rifle open sight event
- Listin Stephen, a film producer and distributor
