= Kurichithanam =

- village
- Location in Kerala, India Kurichithanam (India)
- Coordinates: 9°46′0″N 76°36′0″E
- Country: India
- State: Kerala
- District: Kottayam

Government
  - Type: Panchayati raj (India)
  - Body: Gram panchayat

Population (2011)
  - Total: 9,383

Languages
  - Official: Malayalam, English
- Time zone: UTC+5:30 (IST)
- Vehicle registration: KL-67
- Nearest city: Pala
- Lok Sabha constituency: Kottayam
- Vidhan Sabha constituency: Kaduthuruthy

Kurichithanam is a village in Kottayam district in the state of Kerala, India. K. R. Narayanan, a former president of India, was born in this village.

== Demographics ==
The 2011 Census of India found that Kurichithanam village had a population of 9383, with 4734 males and 4649 females.
