= List of people from Pala =

Notable people from Palai include:

== Politicians ==
- K. R. Narayanan, President of India (1997–2002), Vice-President of India (1992–97).
- K M Mani, Minister of Finance, Revenue, Laws, Kerala State.
- Jose K. Mani Member of Indian Parliament - Lok Sabha (2010-Continuing).
- N M Joseph, Minister of Forests, Kerala State (1987–91)
- M M Jacob, Member of Parliament (Rajya Sabha) (1981-1993), Deputy Chairman of Rajya Sabha (1986–87), Union Minister of Parliamentary Affairs, Home (1987–93), State Governor of Meghalaya (1995–2007).
- Kidangoor Gopalakrishna Pillai, General Secretary of NSS (1967 onwards) and Indian High-Commissioner to Singapore (1992 onwards).
- P K Vasudevan Nair, Member of Parliament, Chief Minister of Kerala State.
- K M Chandy, State Governor (1982–89), President of Kerala Pradesh Congress Committee (I).
- Cherian J. Kappan, Freedom Fighter, Member of Indian Parliament - Lok Sabha (1962–67). Municipal Chairman.
- George Thomas Kottukapally, Member of Indian Parliament - Lok Sabha (1957–62), U.N. Delegate.
- R V Thomas, President (Speaker) of Travancore State Legislative Assembly (1947–49).
- Dr P J Thomas, Member of Madras Legislative Council, 1937–42 and Member of Indian Parliament - Rajya Sabha 1957-62.
- Ulahannan Ulahannan Vadakkan, Member of Sree Moolam Popular Assembly of Travancore State (1912–31).
- J Thomas Kayalackakom, Member of Sree Moolam Popular Assembly of Travancore State (1922–28).

== Literature, education and social service ==
- Aryambika S. V., Malayalam poet.
- Paremmakkal Thoma Kathanar: Author of "Varthamana Pusthakam", the first travelogue in an Indian language.
- Ramapurathu Warrier - Poet (Kuchelavritham).
- Kattakayam Cherian Mappillai (1859–1936) - Author of Sri Yesu Vijayam (1926) & Editor of Vijnaana Rathnaakaram (1913)
- Pala Narayanan Nair, poet, teacher, most celebrated work 'keralam valarunnu'
- Pravithanam PM Devasia, poet
- Lalithambika Antharjanam, novelist
- Fr. Abel Periapuram, Founder of Kalabhavan.
- Paul Zacharia, writer & columnist
- Ezhacherry Ramachandran, poet
- Bishop Sebastian Vayalil, Founder of St. Thomas College
- Cyriac Thomas, former Vice Chancellor

== Government and administration ==
- V. Joseph Thomas IPS, Director General of Police, Kerala.
- V. J. Kurian IAS, Addl. Chief Secretary to Govt. of Kerala. Managing Director of the World's First Solar Powered Airport
- B. Sandhya IPS, writer and police officer.

== Sports ==
- Col. G.V. Raja, sports promoter
- M D Valsamma, athletics, Asian Games Gold Medalist
- Mani C. Kappan international volleyball player

=== Commerce and industry ===
- Joseph Augusti Kayalackakom (1884–1968) - Managing Director of Palai Central Bank.
- Varkey Ouseph Vellookunnel

-Founder Director of Palai Central Bank.

- M.O. Devasia (M.O.D) populary known as pepper king of Kerala
- Annamma kottukapally, Founder, Anns bakery
- Asha Sebastian Mattathil, Founder, M.O.D signature jewellery

=== Movies ===
- Bhadran, movie director
- Miss Kumari, Malayalam actress in leading roles
- Suvarna Mathew, actress
- Ponnamma Babu, actress
- Pala Thankam, actress
- Miya (Gimi George), actress
- Mani C. Kappan, director, producer, actor
- Rimi Tomy, singer
- Meenakshi Anoop, actress
- Listin Stephen, film producer
- Chali Pala, film actor
- Mamitha Baiju, Indian actress
- Sheelu Abraham, film actress

=== Journalists ===
- Jose Panachippuram, associate editor, Malayala Manorama daily
- Eby J Jose, editor, Gulf Life magazine
