= Ponnurunni Marshalling Yard =

Railway yard in Kochi, Kerala, India

The Ponnurunni Marshalling Yard (officially the Ernakulam Marshalling Yard), is a railway marshalling yard in Kochi, Kerala, India. It lies between the Ponnurunni and Kathrikadavu flyovers near Vyttila and covers about 110 acres. It is closed to the public and is used as a coach depot and maintenance facility.

== Redevelopment ==
Proposals to rebuild the yard as a passenger terminal were mande in 2020, when the Kerala Rail Development Corporation was asked to study the site's feasibility. Kochi's existing stations, Ernakulam Junction and Ernakulam Town, have little room to add tracks or platforms.

In June 2026 a project costing the work at ₹267 crore was submitted to the Railway Board. It proposes six platforms, with provision to expand to fifteen in later phases; three pit lines, two of them reserved for Vande Bharat Express rakes; three stabling lines and a wagon repair line; and a main entrance from the upper deck of the Ponnurunni railway overbridge.

There have been proposals to name any station built on the site "Kochi Central" or "Ernakulam Central" to reduce geographical confusion for travelers and place the station entirely within the boundaries of the Kochi Municipal Corporation.
