= Jawaharlal Nehru Stadium (Kochi) =

Multi-purpose stadium in Kerala, India

Jawaharlal Nehru International Stadium
- Kaloor Stadium
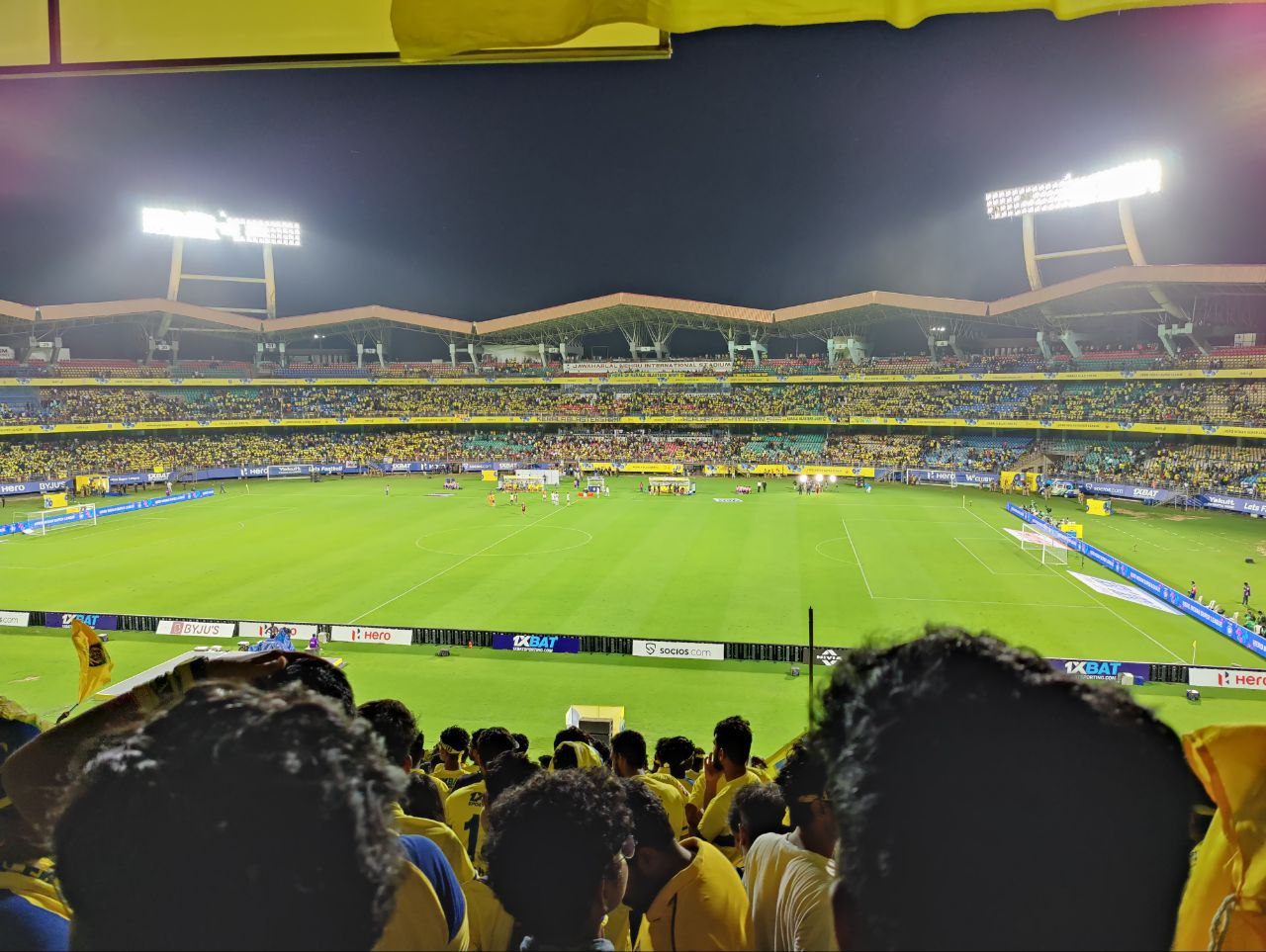
- The stadium during an Indian Super League match of Kerala Blasters FC
- Interactive map of Jawaharlal Nehru International Stadium
- Location: Kaloor, Kochi, India
- Coordinates: 9°59′50″N 76°18′04″E
- Owner: Greater Cochin Development Authority (GCDA)
- Operator: Greater Cochin Development Authority
- Capacity: 41,000
- Executive suites: 109
- Surface: Riviera bermuda grass
- Scoreboard: Yes
- Record attendance: 100,000
- Public transit: J. L. N. Stadium

Construction
- Opened: 1996; 30 years ago
- Renovated: 2000, 2017, 2025

Tenants
- Active; Kerala State Football Team (1997–present); Indian National Football Team (1997– present); Kerala Blasters FC (2014–present); Viva Kerala FC (2002–2012 for selected matches); Kerala Blasters FC Reserves (2016—present for selected matches); Forca Kochi FC (2024—present); Previous; Indian National Cricket Team (1997–2014); Kerala State Cricket Team (1997–2014); Kerala Strikers; Kochi Tuskers Kerala (2011)

The Jawaharlal Nehru International Stadium, commonly known as Kaloor Stadium, is a multi-purpose stadium in Kochi, Kerala, India, currently used for association football. Opened in 1996, initially it had a capacity 100,000 spectators, gradually reduced to comply with operational safety, and now seating 41,000 spectators, although it got limited further during 2017 FIFA U-17 World Cup under FIFA security guidelines. It is the home ground of Kerala Blasters FC of the Indian Super League (ISL) and Forca Kochi FC and hosts various exhibitions, cinema events and political rallies.

The stadium stands are built in a cricket serving configuration and allowed it to be known as the "nosiest cricket stadium in the world". The structure features a unique lighting towers system, the first of its kind in India, that provide 2 kW floodlighting, suitable for HD telecast. Between 1997 and 2014 it hosted a number of international cricket matches, of which 10 were One Day Internationals. While in 2014 the Kerala Cricket Association got a hold of a 30-year lease on the venue from the Greater Cochin Development Authority, the concurrent same-year move-in of Kerala Blasters saw football tenants becoming paramount. Their crowds recorded the fifth loudest noise in the stadium in the world (128 db) during the 2016 ISL final between Blasters and Atletico de Kolkata. An extensive renovation also occurred before the stadium served as one of the six host venues for 2017 FIFA U-17 World Cup held in India.

== History ==
=== Early years and football's popularity ===
The Kaloor Stadium was originally constructed as a cricket stadium. But considering that Kerala is one of the few regions in India where football enjoys considerable popularity it was used for football matches also. Indeed, in a match between India and Iraq in 1997, approximately 100,000 spectators filled up the venue, thus overcrowding it, which remains a record at this place. This was in the Nehru Cup International Football Tournament in 1997, which was the first tournament at the venue.

The stadium won several laurels for being constructed in a timely manner. The stadium was completed under the watchful eyes of late V. Joseph Thomas IPS who was the head of the Greater Cochin Development Authority. He was a huge fan of football from his college days at St. Thomas College, Palai and also served as the patron of the Kerala State Athletics Association. The stadium was inaugurated by then President of India Shankar Dayal Sharma in 1996. It has 1.3 kilometres in outer circle.

=== International cricket ===
After 1998, football went down and cricket took the centre-stage for many years, drawing sell-out and high money grossing games. In fact, the highest money grosser at the venue was made in a cricket ODI match between India and its arch-rival Pakistan in April 2005. The first ODI played on this ground was between India and Australia on 1 April 1998.

Kaloor stadium hosted the first match India played after Sachin Tendulkar's retirement. The pavilion was renamed as Sachin Tendulkar pavilion as an honour to him before this match between India and West Indies on 21 November 2013 which India won by 6 wickets.

The stadium underwent a massive renovation including a modern turf, an aesthetic modern roofing and a four-lane road from the south side of the stadium.

The first Indian Premier League game at the stadium was on 9 April 2011, when the Kochi Tuskers Kerala hosted the Royal Challengers Bangalore. It was the first IPL match for the Kochi Tuskers. Five of their 2011 home games were played in this stadium, and the other two were played at the Holkar Cricket Stadium, Indore. The stadium hosted the semi-final and final of the 2013 Duleep Trophy.

=== Return of football and the ISL ===
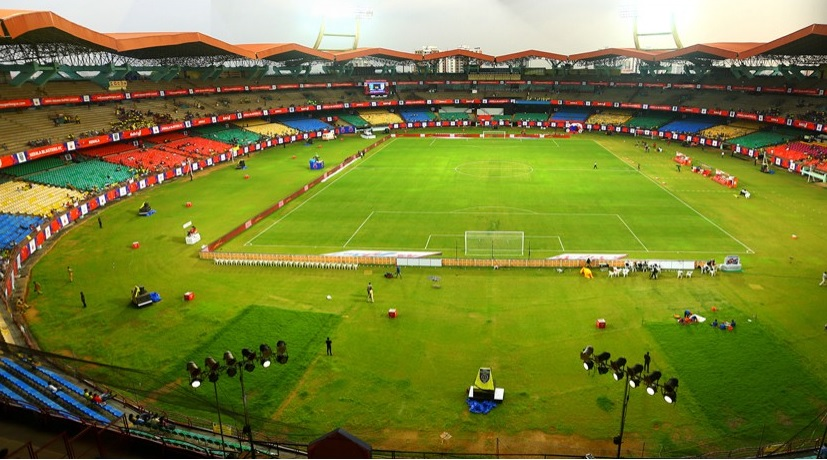
Stadium before the start of an ISL match

In 2011, Chirag United claimed the tenancy of the venue. However, the premier football club of India was still not able to fill up the stadium's massive capacity. Football returned to prominence at the venue after the launch of Indian Super League in 2014. The stadium is the home ground to Kerala Blasters, one of the teams with the most fanbases in the ISL. Some of the games involving the home team drew crowds in excess of 55,000 in the inaugural edition.

The first Indian Super League game at the stadium was on 6 November 2014, when the Kerala Blasters FC hosted the FC Goa. It was the first ISL match for the Kerala Blasters. The stadium had an average attendance of over 40,000 for the Indian Super League matches in 2014. The game between Kerala Blasters FC and Chennaiyin FC saw 61,323 spectators on 30 November 2014.

The stadium was the venue for 2013 Santosh Trophy finals.

Compromised safety features have plagued the stadium more recently, despite a renovation to comply with such in the 2010s. Cricket clubs left for venues like Greenfield International Stadium. For the 2017 FIFA U-17 World Cup it was restricted to 29,000 spectators. Later identified issues of deteriorating roof, flawed load-bearing pillars, non-operational smoke detection systems led to non-compliance with the All India Football Federation's Premier 1 license.

=== In popular culture ===
The famous "Maro Maro" song composed by A.R. Rahman for the Tamil movie Boys directed by Shankar, climax scenes of the Tamil movie Velayudham starring Vijay, Malayalam movie Run Baby Run starring Mohanlal and many other Indian Films were shot in the stadium.

== ODI matches held ==
1 April 1998
Scorecard

India; 309/5 (50 overs)	v	Australia; 268 (45.5 overs)
A Jadeja 105 * (109); MS Kasprowicz 3/50 (8.2 overs)		AC Gilchrist 61 (45); Sachin Tendulkar 5/32 (10 overs)

India won by 41 runs
Umpires: SK Bansal and AV Jayaprakash
Player of the match: Sachin Tendulkar (India)

- India won the toss and elected to bat first.

9 March 2000
Scorecard

India; 302/7 (49.4 overs)	v	South Africa; 301/3 (50 overs)
Ajay Jadeja 92 (109); WJ Cronje 2/48 (8 overs)		G.Kirsten 115 (123); Rahul Dravid 2/43 (9 overs)

India won by 3 wickets
Umpires: MR Singh and CR Vijayaraghavan
Player of the match: A Jadeja (India)

- South Africa won the toss and elected to bat first.

13 March 2002
Scorecard

India; 191 (48.3 overs)	v	Zimbabwe; 197/4 (44.2 overs)
Mohammad Kaif 56 (78); Douglas Hondo 4/37 (8.3 overs)		ADR Campbell 71 (119); Ajit Agarkar 2/28 (10 overs)

Zimbabwe won by 6 wickets
Umpires: Vijay Chopra and Devendra Sharma
Player of the match: Douglas Hondo

- India won the toss and elected to bat first.

2 April 2005
Scorecard

India; 281/8 (50 overs)	v	Pakistan; 194 (45.2 overs)
Virender Sehwag 108 (95); Arshad Khan 4/33 (6 overs)		Mohammad Hafeez 42 (75); Sachin Tendulkar 5/50 (10 overs)

India won by 87 runs
Umpires: Billy Bowden (New Zealand) and AV Jayaprakash
Player of the match: Virender Sehwag

- India won the toss and elected to bat first.

6 April 2006
Scorecard

India; 238/6 (47.2 overs)	v	England; 237 (48.4 overs)
Rahul Dravid 65* (73); Ian Blackwell 2/41 (10 overs)		Geraint Jones 49 (66); Yuvraj Singh 2/34 (8 overs)

India won by 4 wickets
Umpires: K Hariharan (India) and RE Koertzen (South Africa)
Player of the match: Yuvraj Singh

- England won the toss and elected to bat first.

2 October 2007
Scorecard

India; 222 (47.3 overs)	v	Australia; 306/6 (50 overs)
MS Dhoni 58 (88); George Hogg 3/40 (9.3 overs)		Bradley Haddin 87* (69); S Sreesanth 3/67 (9 overs)

Australia won by 84 runs
Umpires: SA Bucknor (West Indies) and SL Shastri
Player of the match: Bradley Haddin

- India won the toss and elected to field first.

17 October 2010
Scorecard

India	v	Australia

Match abandoned without a ball bowled due to rain.
Umpires: Billy Bowden (New Zealand) and AM Saheba (India)

15 January 2013
Scorecard

India; 285/6 (50 overs)	v	England; 158/10 (36 overs)
MS Dhoni 72 (66); ST Finn 2/51 (10 overs)		Kevin Pietersen 42 (44); B Kumar 3/29 (10 overs)

India won by 127 runs
Umpires: Vineet Kulkarni and Steve Davis
Player of the match: Ravindra Jadeja (India)

- India won the toss and elected to bat first.

21 November 2013
Scorecard

India; 212–4 (35.2 overs)	v	West Indies; 211 (48.5 overs)
Virat Kohli 86 (84); J Holder 2/48 (8 overs)		DM Bravo 59 (77); R Jadeja 3/37 (10 overs)

India won by 6 wickets
Umpires: VA Kulkarni( India) and RJ Tucker( Australia)
Player of the match: Virat Kohli (India)

- West Indies won the toss and elected to bat first.

8 October 2014
Scorecard

India; 197	v	West Indies; 321
Shikhar Dhawan 68 (92); Marlon Samuels 2/10 (3 overs)		Marlon Samuels 126 (116); Mohammed Shami 4/66 (9 overs)

West Indies won by 124 runs
Umpires: IJ Gould( England) and S Ravi( India)
Player of the match: MN Samuels (West Indies)

- India won the toss and elected to field first.

== Indian Premier League ==
The cricket stadium in Kochi was expected to serve the Chennai Super Kings or the Royal Challengers Bangalore as a home venue apart from Chennai and Bangalore for the initial IPL seasons. However both the franchises initially refused and later promised to reconsider the offer, fearing a decline in revenues. Eventually no matches of the first 3 IPL seasons were played in Kochi.

The auction for expanding the initial eight franchises to ten for the 2011 season was held on 22 March 2010. Rendezvous Sports World made the second highest bid of ₹ 15333 million, and elected to base its team in Kochi.

The first IPL match held at the stadium was between Kochi Tuskers Kerala and Royal Challengers Bangalore on 9 April 2011. The match was also Kochi Tuskers first ever IPL match.

9 April 2011
(Scorecard)

Kochi Tuskers Kerala; 161/5 (20 overs)	v	Royal Challengers Bangalore; 162/4 (18.4 overs)
B McCullum 45 (32); D Vettori 1–17 (4 overs)		AB de Villiers 54 (40); R Jadeja 1–28 (4 overs)

Royal Challengers Bangalore won by 6 wickets
Umpires: Kumar Dharmasena (SL) and Krishna Hariharan (Ind)
Player of the match: AB de Villiers (Royal Challengers Bangalore)

- Kochi Tuskers Kerala won the toss and elected to bat

18 April 2011
(Scorecard)

Kochi Tuskers Kerala; 135/3 (15 overs)	v	Chennai Super Kings; 131/4 (17 overs)
B McCullum 47 (33); R Ashwin 2–31 (4 overs)		SK Raina 50 (40); RV Gomez 1–20 (2 overs)

Kochi Tuskers Kerala won by 7 wickets (D/L method)
Umpires: Krishna Hariharan (Ind) and Tony Hill (NZ)
Player of the match: BB McCullum (Kochi Tuskers Kerala)

- Kochi Tuskers won the toss and elected to field
- Match reduced to 17 overs per side due to rain. Kochi's target was adjusted to 135 runs from 17 overs via the Duckworth–Lewis method.

27 April 2011
(Scorecard)

Kochi Tuskers Kerala; 74 (16.3 overs)	v	Deccan Chargers; 129/6 (20 overs)
Ravindra Jadeja 23 (35); Ishant Sharma 5/12 (3 overs)		Kumar Sangakkara 65 (47); Vinay Kumar 3/25 (4 overs)

Deccan Chargers won by 55 runs
Umpires: Kumar Dharmasena (SL) and Tony Hill (NZ)
Player of the match: Ishant Sharma (Deccan Chargers)

- Kochi Tuskers Kerala won the toss and elected to field.

30 April 2011
(Scorecard)

Kochi Tuskers Kerala; 119 (18.5 overs)	v	Delhi Daredevils; 157/7 (20 overs)
Ravindra Jadeja 31 (22); Morné Morkel 3/18 (4 overs)		Virender Sehwag 80 (47); Sreesanth 2/10 (4 overs)

Delhi Daredevils won by 38 runs
Umpires: Kumar Dharmasena (SL) and Tony Hill (NZ)
Player of the match: Virender Sehwag (Delhi Daredevils)

- Delhi Daredevils won the toss and elected to bat.

5 May 2011
(Scorecard)

Kochi Tuskers Kerala; 156/5 (20 overs)	v	Kolkata Knight Riders; 139/7 (20 overs)
Mahela Jayawardene 55 (41); Jaydev Unadkat 2/25 (4 overs)		Eoin Morgan 66 (51); Raiphi Gomez 2/14 (4 overs)

Kochi Tuskers Kerala won by 17 runs
Umpires: Rod Tucker (Aus) and S. Ravi (Ind)
Player of the match: Brad Hodge (Kochi Tuskers Kerala)

- Kolkata Knight Riders won the toss and elected to field.

== ODI records at the venue ==
Batting

- Highest Total: 321/6 (50 overs) by West Indies vs. India on 8 October 2014.
- Lowest Total: 191 (48.3 overs) by India vs. Zimbabwe on 13 March 2002.
- Most Runs : Rahul Dravid (223 runs from 292 balls in 5 matches)
- Highest Score: Marlon Samuels (West Indies) 126* runs from 116 balls vs. India on 8 October 2014.
- Average 1st innings total : 273
- Average 2nd innings total : 225

Bowling

- Most Wickets : Sachin Tendulkar (10 Wickets, 33 Overs, 4 Matches)
- Best Bowling : Sachin Tendulkar 5/32 (India vs. Australia on 1 April 1998)

=== Highest partnerships by wicket ===
Wicket	Runs	Team	Players		Opposition
1st	235	South Africa	Gary Kirsten	Herschelle Gibbs	India
2nd	76	India	Rahul Dravid	IK Pathan	England
3rd	201	India	Rahul Dravid	Virender Sehwag	Pakistan
4th	165	West Indies	Denesh Ramdin	Marlon Samuels	India
5th	121	India	HH Kanitkar	Ajay Jadeja	Australia
6th	96	India	MS Dhoni	Ravindra Jadeja	England
7th	17	Pakistan	Shahid Afridi	Mohammad Hafeez	India
8th	25	India	Mahendra Singh Dhoni	Ramesh Powar	Australia
9th	28	England	MJ Hoggard	GO Jones	India
10th	42	Pakistan	Naved-ul-Hasan	Arshad Khan	India

== List of centuries ==
=== Key ===
- * denotes that the batsman was not out.
- Inns. denotes the number of the innings in the match.
- Balls denotes the number of balls faced in an innings.
- NR denotes that the number of balls was not recorded.
- Parentheses next to the player's score denotes his century number at Edgbaston.
- The column title Date refers to the date the match started.
- The column title Result refers to the player's team result

=== One Day Internationals ===
No.	Score	Player	Team	Balls	Inns.	Opposing team	Date	Result
1	105*	Ajay Jadeja	India	109	1	Australia	1 April 1998	Won
2	115	Gary Kirsten	South Africa	123	1	India	9 March 2000	Lost
3	111	Herschelle Gibbs	South Africa	127	1	India	9 March 2000	Lost
4	108	Virender Sehwag	India	95	1	Pakistan	2 April 2005	Won
5	104	Rahul Dravid	India	139	1	Pakistan	2 April 2005	Won
6	126*	Marlon Samuels	West Indies	106	1	India	8 October 2014	Lost

== List of Five Wicket Hauls ==
=== Key ===
Symbol	Meaning
†	The bowler was man of the match
‡	10 or more wickets taken in the match
§	One of two five-wicket hauls by the bowler in the match
Date	Day the Test started or ODI was held
Inn	Innings in which five-wicket haul was taken
Overs	Number of overs bowled.
Runs	Number of runs conceded
Wkts	Number of wickets taken
Econ	Runs conceded per over
Batsmen	Batsmen whose wickets were taken
Drawn	The match was drawn.

=== One Day Internationals ===
No.	Bowler	Date	Team	Opposing team	Inn	Overs	Runs	Wkts	Econ	Batsmen	Result
1	Sachin Tendulkar	1 April 1998	India	Australia	2	10	32	5	3.2	Steve Waugh; Darren Lehmann; Michael Bevan; Tom Moody; Damien Martyn	Won
2	Sachin Tendulkar	2 April 2005	India	Pakistan	2	10	50	5	5	Inzamam-ul-Haq; Abdul Razzaq; Shahid Afridi; Mohammad Sami; Mohammad Hafeez	Won

== IPL records at venue ==
- Most Runs : Brendon McCullum (Kochi)
- Most Wickets : Vinay Kumar (Kochi) (6)
- Highest total in an innings : Royal Challengers Bangalore (162/4)
- Lowest total in an innings : Kochi Tuskers Kerala (74/10)
- Highest Score: Virender Sehwag (Delhi Daredevils) vs Kochi Tuskers Kerala (80 runs from 47 balls)
- Best Bowling : Ishant Sharma (5/12) vs. Kochi Tuskers Kerala
- Highest partnership : Sangakkara and Cameron White (90 runs off 69 balls)

=== Highest partnerships by wicket ===
Wicket	Runs	Team	Players		Opposition
1st	80	Kochi Tuskers Kerala	Brendon McCullum	V.V.S.Laxman	Royal Challengers Bangalore
2nd	51	Kochi Tuskers Kerala	Brendon McCullum	P Patel	Chennai Super Kings
3rd	51	Kochi Tuskers Kerala	Klinger	M Jayawardene	Kolkata Knight Riders
4th	90	Deccan Chargers	CL White	KC Sangakkara	Kochi Tuskers Kerala
5th	41	Delhi Daredevils	Virender Sehwag	TR Birt	Kochi Tuskers Kerala
6th	22*	Kochi Tuskers Kerala	Brad Hodge	R Gomez	Kolkata Knight Riders
7th	36	Kochi Tuskers Kerala	RA Jadeja	NLTC Perera	Deccan Chargers
8th	26	Kochi Tuskers Kerala	RA Jadeja	R Vinay Kumar	Deccan Chargers
9th	1	Kochi Tuskers Kerala	R Vinay Kumar	S Sreesanth	Deccan Chargers
10th	1	Kochi Tuskers Kerala	R P Singh	R Vinay Kumar	Delhi Daredevils

== Kerala Blasters FC ==
The stadium is the official home ground for the Kerala Blasters FC in Indian Super League since 2014. Kerala Blasters had won their first ISL home match against FC Goa for 1–0 conducted on 6 November 2014.

The game between Kerala Blasters FC and Chennaiyin FC saw 61,234 spectators on 30 November 2014. Kerala Blasters had the highest average attendance (47,427) for football clubs outside of Europe in domestic league matches, at that time.

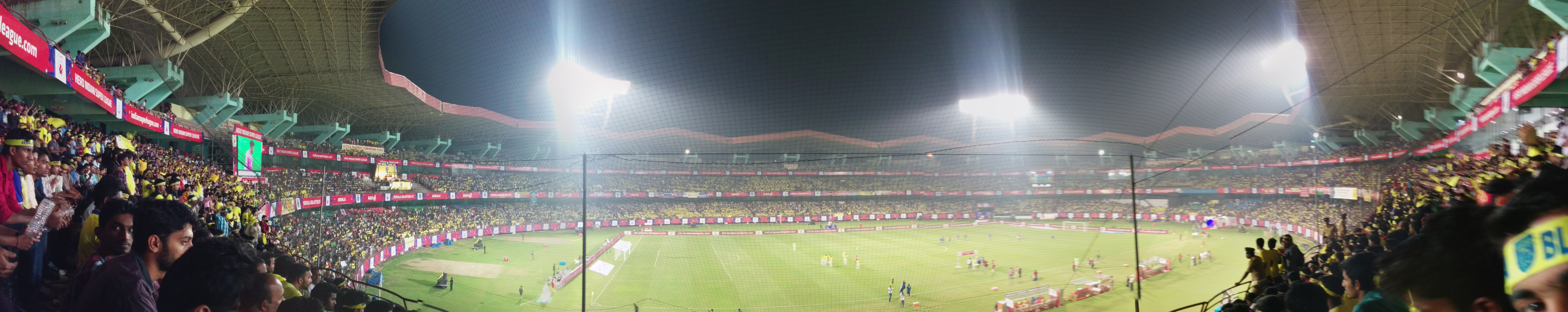
Jawaharlal Nehru Stadium on Blasters Matchday

In the inaugural season of Indian Super League, Kerala Blasters finished fourth in the group stages with 19 points from 14 games and qualified for Semi-final after beating Pune City FC. Kerala Blasters FC was unbeaten in six of their seven home games. In semi-final which happened to be the last home match of this year for Kerala Blasters FC, Kerala Blasters FC won in emphatic fashion by trouncing toppers Chennaiyin FC with scoreline 3–0. One of the goals was scored by Malayali midfielder Sushanth Mathew away from 30 yards through a curling long-ranger, shot over renowned footballers Alessandro Nesta and Mikaël Silvestre and it became a proud and memorable moment for sports fans in Kerala. The opening ceremony of Hero Indian Super League 2017/18 was hosted in the stadium.

== Viva Kerala FC ==
The former I-League football team Viva Kerala FC (Chirag United Club Kerala) played their home matches for the 2011–12 I-League season and also selected matches at the venue.

== 2017 FIFA U-17 World Cup ==
On 5 December 2013, the FIFA Executive Committee chaired by FIFA President Joseph S. Blatter decided that host of 2017 FIFA U-17 World Cup will be India upon evaluation of bid sent by AIFF with Kochi as one of the eight possible venues. Later, Chief Minister of Kerala Mr.Oommen Chandy stated that they will soon sign a Memorandum of Understanding (MoU) with the Sports Ministry in that regard after an exclusive cabinet meet on the issue. Government has appointed senior IAS officer Mr. APM Mohammed Hanish as Nodal Officer as per Fifa's direction.

On 11 December 2014, FIFA team inspected the stadium and emphasised to improve the quality of pitch and need of bucket seats in the second tier of the stadium. With Kochi registering an average crowd of 47,000 for ISL, the city has gathered attention from the authorities in terms of attracting crowd.

On 6 April 2015, AIFF cleared Kochi as one of the venues after receiving FIFA's technical committee report. Delhi, Mumbai, Guwahati, Goa and Kolkata are the other venues.

== Forca Kochi FC ==
The stadium is the home ground of the Super League Kerala club Forca Kochi FC since 2024.

== Kerala Strikers ==
The Celebrity Cricket League team Kerala Strikers played its home matches in the stadium since 2012 upon till 2016.

== Accessibility ==
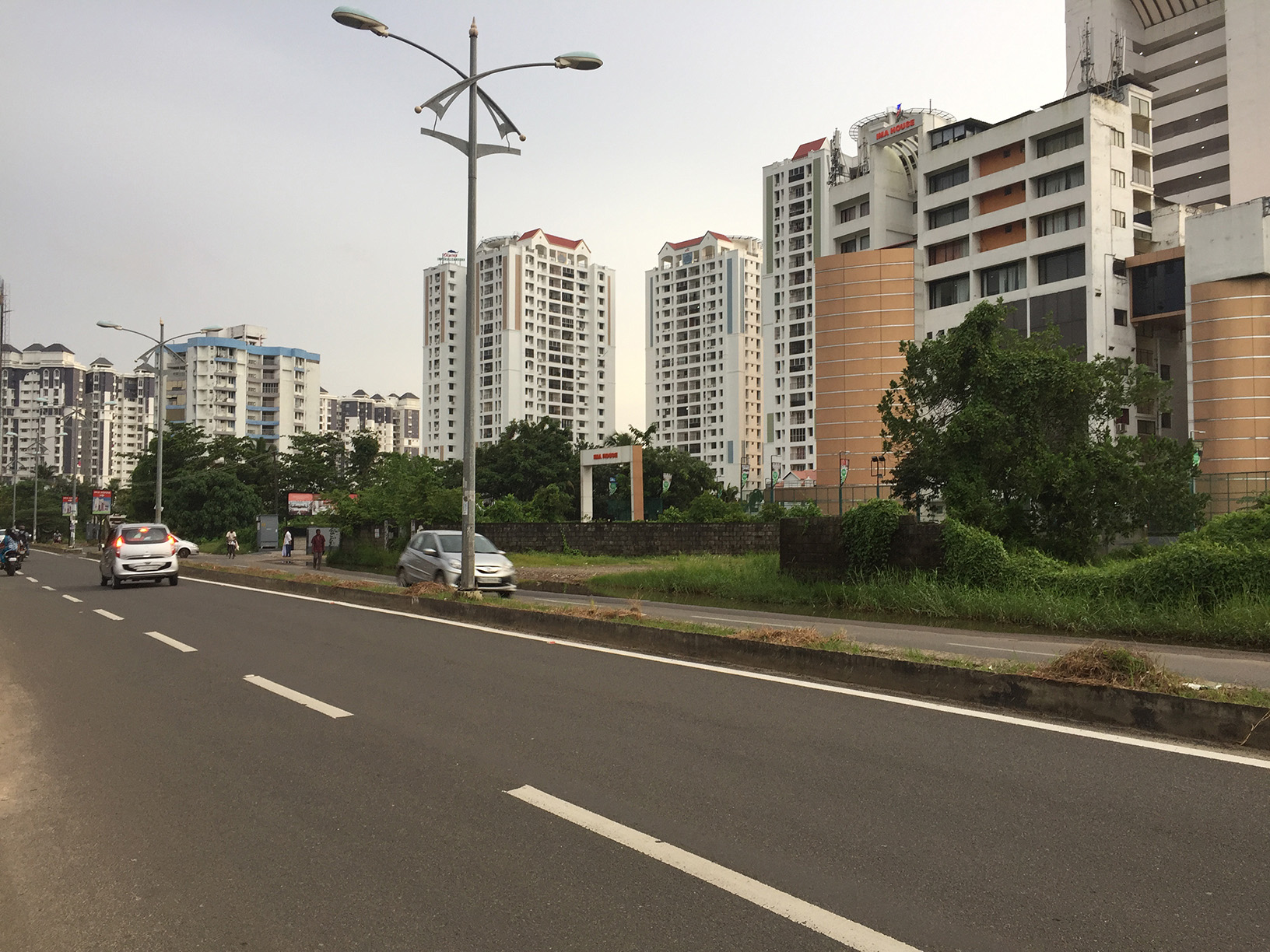
Stadium Link Road

The Jawaharlal Nehru International Stadium is located in the heart of the city. It lies beside the Banerjee Road between Kaloor and Palarivattom, a common stretch among many city bus routes. The Stadium Link Road from the southern side allows access from Thammanam and Kathrikadavu, although there is no public transport along this route. The stadium is situated at 2.5 and 5.2 km (1.6 and 3.2 mi) from the North (Town) and South (Junction) railway stations respectively.

All city buses passing through the Kaloor-Palarivattom stretch have a stop at the stadium. The JLN Stadium metro station of the Kochi Metro is situated right in front of the stadium. The presence of a prominent bus stop as well as a metro station makes it a prime location and one which can be easily accessed from any part of the city.

== Gallery ==
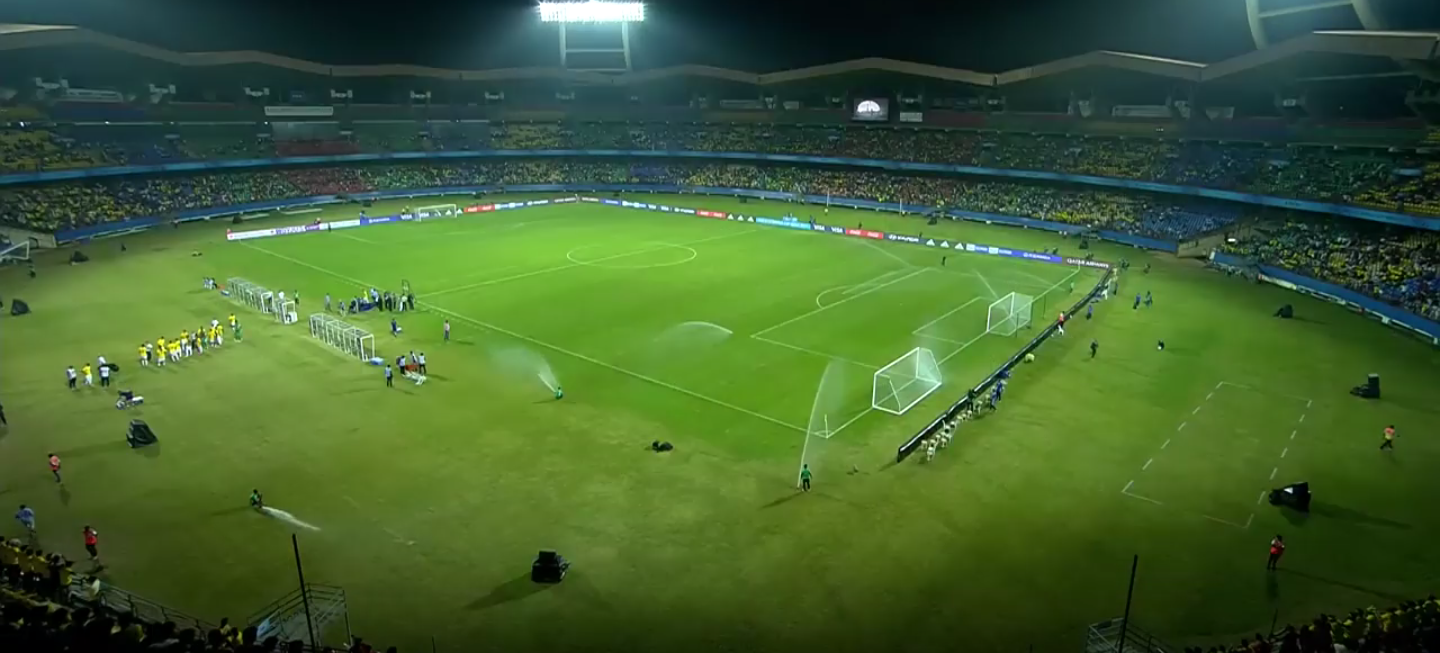
Stadium before a FIFA U-17 World Cup Match.

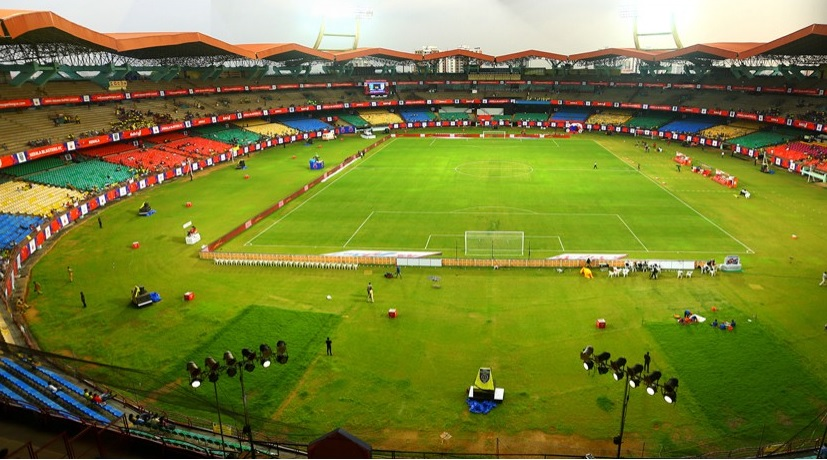
Stadium before an ISL Match.

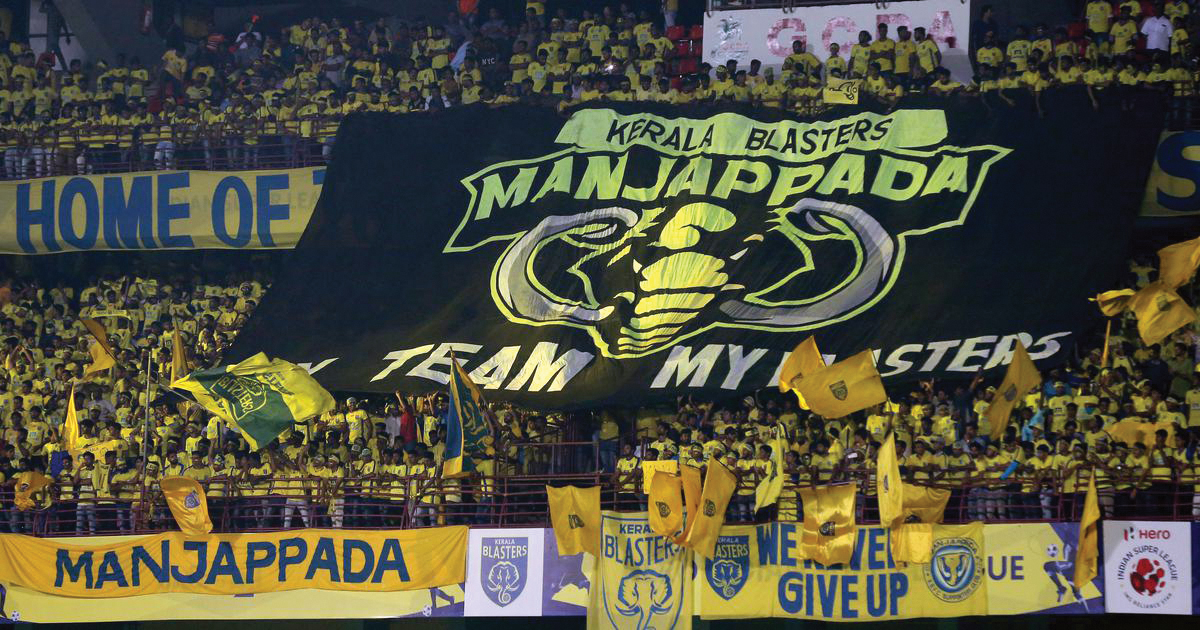
Manjappada (Yellow Army) during a match in Kochi.

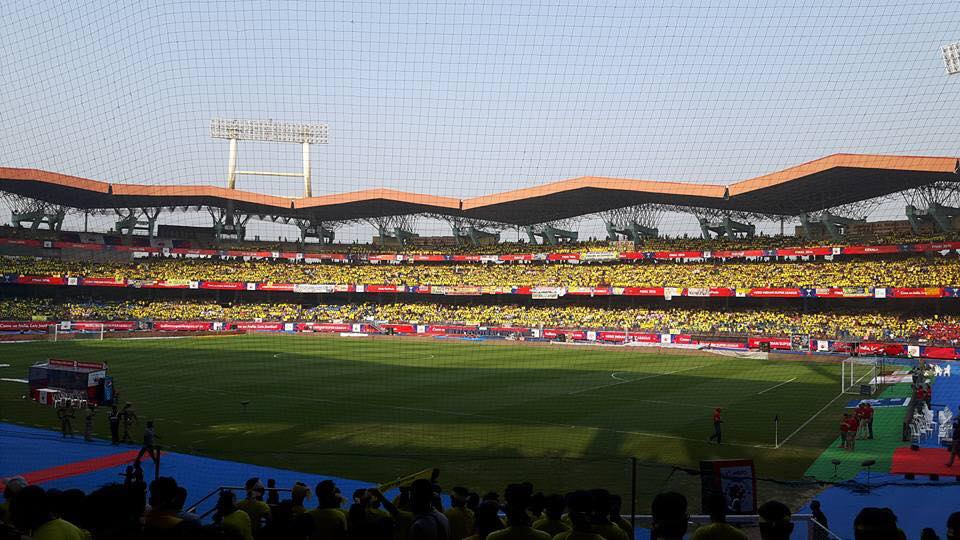
2016 Indian Super League final between ATK and Kerala Blasters.

== See also ==
- Sports in Kerala
- List of stadiums in India
- V. Joseph Thomas IPS
- Kerala Cricket Association
- Greater Cochin Development Authority
- List of football stadiums in India
- List of Asian stadiums by capacity
- List of association football stadiums by capacity
- Lists of stadiums
