= Ponnurunni ROB =

- Carries: Vytilla - Thammanam
- Locale: Vytilla, Kerala, India

Characteristics
- Total length: 624 m (2,047 ft)

History
- Opened: February 2014

The Ponnurunni Railway Over-Bridge (ROB) is a infrastructure project in Kochi, Kerala. It provides an essential roadway link connecting Vyttila to Thammanam and Kathrikadavu.

The 624 meter long bridge was constructed to bypass a railway level crossing. It creates an easy passage from Vyttila towards Ponnurunni, Thammanam and Palarivattom.

The construction cost was roughly Rs. 20–28 crore. This price also includes the land acquisition amount.
