= V. Joseph Thomas =

Indian police chief (1941–2018)

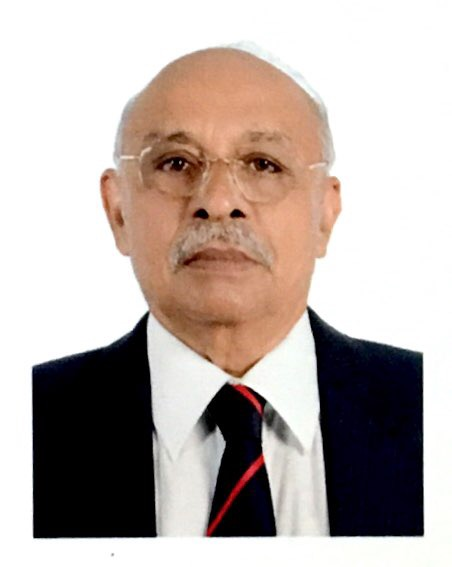
- Born: 30 November 1941; Edamattom, Kottayam, Kerala, India
- Died: 10 February 2018 (aged 76)
- Spouse: Mariamma Thomas
- Relatives: V. J. Kurian (brother)
- Police career
- Department: Kerala Police
- Service years: 1965–2001
- Rank: Director General of Police
- Awards: President's Police Medal for Distinguished Service

Vattavayalil Joseph Thomas (30 November 1941 – 10 February 2018), known simply as Joseph Thomas in police and political circles, was an Indian Police Service officer and former Indian Army officer, who served as the Director General of Kerala Police.

== Personal life ==
V. Joseph Thomas was born to V. J. Joseph, Vattavayalil House and Aleykutty Joseph, Pamblani House at Palai in Kottayam District, Kerala. He married Mariamma Thomas and had one daughter. He retired from the police force in November 2001 and lived in Cochin, Kerala. He served as a patron at several organizations.

His younger brother, V. J. Kurian was the Additional Chief Secretary to the Government of Kerala and former managing director of Cochin International Airport Limited.

== Education ==
Joseph Thomas did his schooling in St. Thomas College, Palai. Soon after graduating from Government Law College, Thiruvananthapuram, he decided to join the Indian Armed Forces. He was trained at the Indian Military Academy before joining the Indian Army.

== Career ==
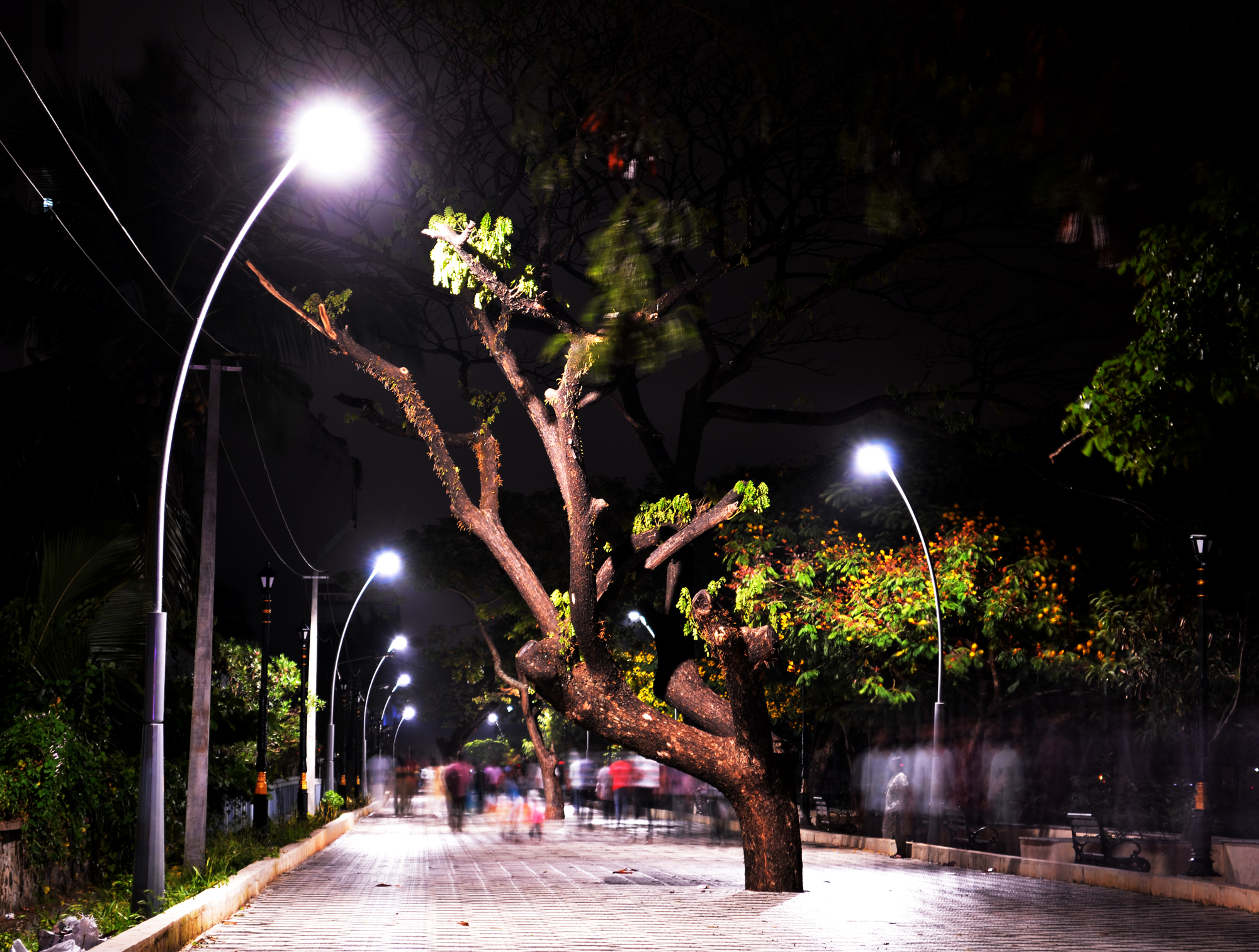
Marine Drive Walkway at night

Joseph Thomas joined the Indian Army in early 1964 at the age of 22 and saw action in the Indo-Pakistani War of 1965. In early September 1965, he successfully captained his group of men deep into enemy territory during the height of the war. After a few years of service in the Indian Army, he passed the Indian Civil Services Examination in 1969 and joined the Indian Police Service, being the only native from Kerala in that batch of officers. His first posting was as the Assistant Superintendent of Police in Palakkad district. He also served as Superintendent of Police, Kozhikode, Commissioner of Police, Trivandrum, Commissioner of Police, Cochin, Inspector General of Police, Headquarters, Thiruvananthapuram and Director General of Police, Vigilance Thiruvananthapuram. At the time of retirement, he served as the Director of the Vigilance and Anti Corruption Bureau. He also served as the founding managing director at the Kerala Police Housing and Construction Corporation Ltd.

Joseph Thomas is best remembered by the city of Cochin for being the brain behind the conception, building and inauguration of the Jawaharlal Nehru Stadium (Kochi) which was completed in 1996 ahead of schedule. This he accomplished while serving as the Chairman of the Greater Cochin Development Authority and was also decorated by the President of India for this effort. Another project he is remembered for is the beautification of the Marine Drive, Kochi into an iconic walkway and also his efforts to develop the Perandoor Canal along the lines of the Grand Canal (Venice). Joseph Thomas also served as the patron of the Kerala State Athletics Association. He also served as a patron at Vidyodaya School, Cochin, Kerala. Until his demise, he was involved in various projects in the city of Cochin and spoke at public events. He was also actively involved in humanitarian and charitable causes.

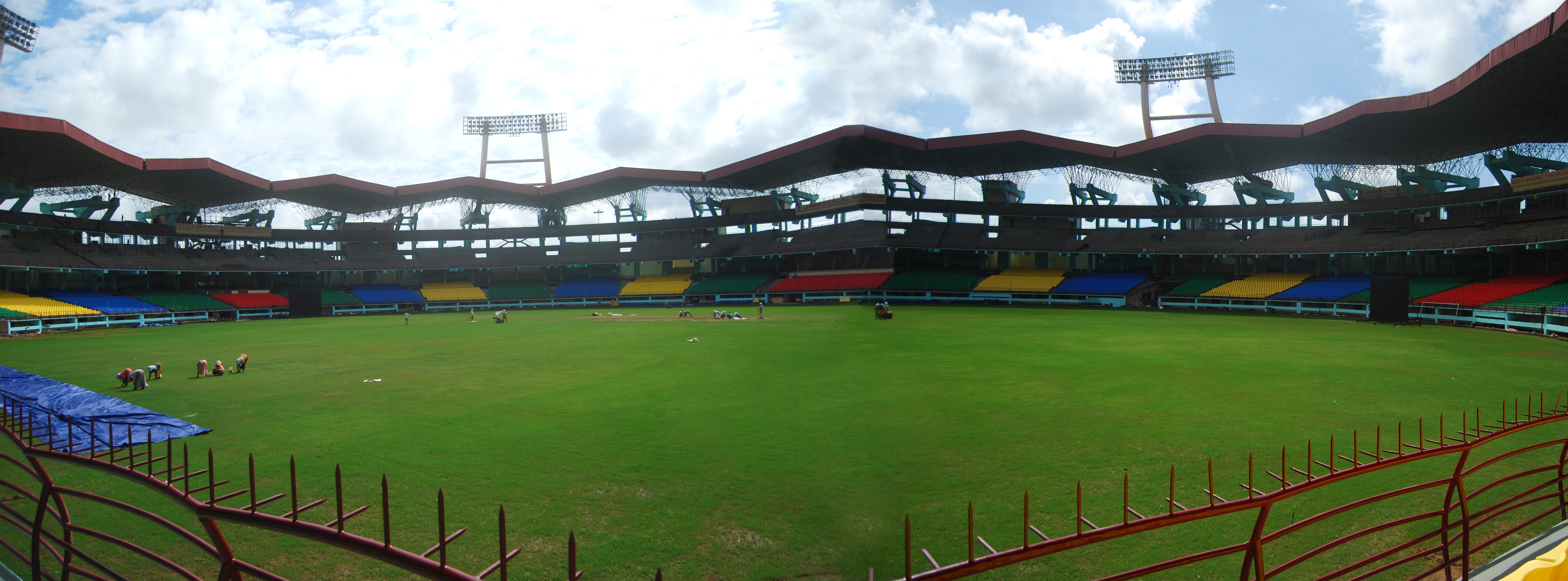
Panoramic View of the Stadium

== See also ==
- List of people from Palai
