= Kattakayam Cherian Mappillai =

Indian poet

- Born: 24 February 1859; Pala, Kottayam, Kerala, India
- Died: 29 November 1936 (aged 77)
- Occupations: Poet, writer
- Spouse: Mariyamma
- Relatives: Ulahannan (father); Cecily (mother)
- Writing career
- Notable works: Shree Yeshu Vijayam; Marthomavijayam; Vanithamani

Kattakayam Cherian Mappillai (1859–1936) was an Indian poet and playwright of Malayalam literature. He was known for the epic poem Shreeyeshu Vijayam, which earned him the title of Mahakavi. He was the founder editor of Vijnaana Rathnaakaram, one of the earliest literary magazines in Malayalam language. Pope Pius XI presented him a gold medal in 1931.

== Biography ==
Cherian Mappillai was born on 24 February 1859 in Pala in Kottayam district of the south Indian state of Kerala in a Christian family to Ulahannan and Cecily. His schooling was limited to Sanskrit studies with Njavakkattu Damodaran Kartha for a few years by which time, he had already started writing poems. His early poems were published in Nasrani Deepika magazine in 1887 and in 1890, he started a poetry column in Malayala Manorama, encouraged by Kandathil Varghese Mappillai, the founder of the daily. He wrote a number of poems and plays and the most known among them was Shree Yeshu Vijayam, a mahakavya in 24 cantos on the Bible, detailing from the Book of Genesis to the New Testament. It was the first Malayalam language epic by a Christian writer.

Cherian Mappillai was a rubber farmer by profession and co-founded Meenachil Rubber Factory, one of the earliest rubber factories in Kerala. When J. Thomas Kayalackakom founded Vijnaana Rathnaakaram in 1913, Cherian Mappilai served as its founder editor. He was married to Mariyamma from Kadakkachira veedu and he died on 29 November 1936, at the age 77.

== Bibliography ==
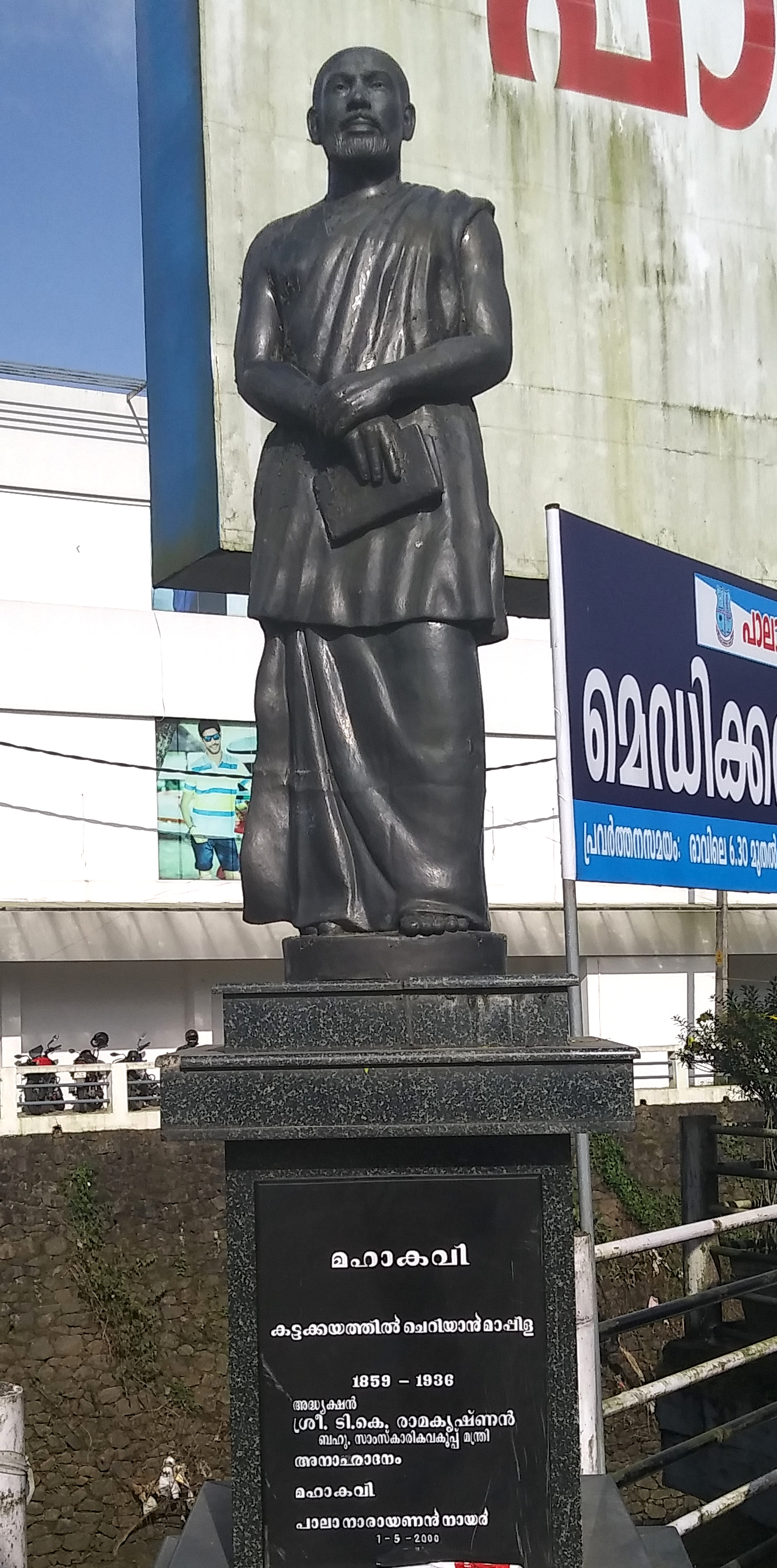
Statue of Mappila at Pala, Kerala.

=== Poems ===
1. Shree Yeshu Vijayam – 1911–1926
2. Mar Thoma Charitham – 1908
3. Vanithaamani – 1915
4. Susannah – 1928
5. Matthoo Tharakan – 1924
6. Thiranjedukkappetta Paathram – 1926
7. Juse Bhakthan – 1880

=== Plays ===
1. Yoodajeeveshwari – 1890
2. Villalvettam – 1894
3. Olivervijayam – 1897
4. Saaraavivaaham – 1902
5. Kalaavathi – 1903
