= V. J. Kurian =

Indian administrative officer

- Born: 23 February 1957 (age 69); Edamattom, Kerala, India
- Occupation: Civil servant
- Years active: 1983–present
- Spouse: Mariamma Kurian
- Children: 2
- Relatives: V. Joseph Thomas (brother)

Vattavayalil Joseph Kurian is an Indian civil servant.

== Personal life ==
V. J. Kurian was born to V. J. Joseph, Vattavayalil House and Aleykutty Joseph, Pamblani House at Edamattom, Pala, Kerala in Kottayam District. He is married to Mariamma Kurian and has one son and one daughter. V. Joseph Thomas IPS is his elder brother. He lives in Cochin and serves as the Managing Director of the Cochin International Airport.

Under his leadership, the airport won the distinction of being the world's first solar powered airport.

He has a master's degree in Economics from St. Stephen's College, Delhi.

== Career ==
Kurian joined the Kerala cadre of the Indian Administrative Service in 1983 and has held various positions in the bureaucracy. He is currently the Chairman of The South Indian Bank. He has been the Managing Director (MD) of Oushadhi, a state-run pharmaceutical company, Spices Board Chairman and MD of Roads and Bridges Development Corporation. He has had three terms as the MD of Cochin International Airport and was awarded the M. K. K. Nair Award in 2017.
