= Edamattom =

Village in Kottayam District, Kerala, India

Edamattom is a small village on the bank of Meenachil River located in Poovarany Village in the Kottayam district, state of Kerala, India. The town lies 6.5 km (4.0 mi) southeast of Pala. Nearby towns and village include Amparanirappel, Bharananganam, Kizhaparayar, Poovarani and Vilakkumadom. Though it is a very small village, Edamattom is the home to the headquarters of Meenachil Panchayat, as well as accompanying services, including the Krishi Bhavan (Office of the Co-Operative of Farmers), the Political Associate Office of the Village (Poovarany) and the Meenachil Service Co-operative Bank. The village also contains an Ayurvedic hospital. The most prominent church in Edamattom is the St. Michael's Church. All these are considerably good landmarks for tourists and strangers, who come to Edamattom to live there. Occupationally, most residents are dependent on agriculture. The primary focus of agriculture in the village is rubber and as such the village contains a rich vegetation of rubber trees.

== Demographics ==
In Edamattom, there is a large population density as in other towns that play are headquarters of a gram panchayat (Meenachil Gram panchayatpanchayat) in India. As this village is located on the banks of the Meenachil River, it is built on fertile alluvial soils in which considerably good vegetation of rubber trees (Hevea brasiliensis) are found. There are also trees of the species Alstonia scholaris. Like any other village in Kerala, Edamatton is subject to heavy rainfall which supports the growth of these rubber trees. Unlike many other villages of Kerala which are dominated by fishing, Edamattom, which is dominated by agriculture and local government.

== Schools ==
- K.T.T.M L.P school - Managed by Kuruvinakunnel family. (Classes or Grades 1&4)
- K.T.J.M High School - Managed by CMI fathers. (Classes or Grades 5&10).
- V.K.P.M. N.S.S. T.T.I - Managed by NSS Karayogam No. 363.

== Other landmarks ==
- Ponmala Devi Temple managed by NSS Karayogam No. 363
- Puthen Sabarimala Ayyappa Temple managed by NSS Karayogam No. 363
- Pankapattu Siva Temple managed by NSS Karayogam No. 363
- Paramattathu Bhagavathi Temple managed by Mata Amritanandamayi Math Edamattom. Puthuppallil Kudumbayogam dedicated the temple and adjoining properties to Mata Amritananda Mayi Math Pala Centre of Amritananda Mayi Math now operates there.
- Puthuppallil Kottaram Bhagavathy Temple managed by Puthuppallil Kudumbayogam. Paramattathu Bhagavathy Temple and Puthuppallil Kottaram Bhagavathy Temple were owned by ancient Puthuppallil Nair Tharavad, Idamattom. It presently consists of Puthuppallil, Vettapurayidam, Erthedathu, Vandanani, Padinjare Vakavayal, Akkaparampel and Kizhakevakavayal Thavazhies (matrilineal descendants) of Puthuppallil Tharavad.
- F. C. Convent
- Chavara Ashram
- Head Office of the Meenachil Service Co operative Bank Ltd.
- Meenachil Panchayath Office
- Poovarany Village Office
- Edamattom Post Office (PIN 686588)
- Pala centre of Amitananda Mayi Math

== Puthan Sabarimala Ayyappa Temple ==
Puthan Sabarimala Ayyappa Temple, a Hindu temple, is situated at Edamattom. The temple is managed by NSS Karayogam No.363. The main deity of the temple is Ayyappa The major festival, Makaravilakku.

== St. Michael's Church ==
St. Michael's Church is located right at the center of Edamattom. The church was established in 17th thulam 1865 (Malayalam era). The first vicar was Rev. Fr Anthoniachan Thondanadu. The present vicar is Rev. Fr George Moolechalil

== C M I Chavara Ashram ==
The Chavara Ashram was established in 1981. Fr. Mathew Aythamattom cmi was the first superior. The present superior is Fr. Kurian Vengathanam CMI

== Ponmala Devi Temple ==
Ponmala Devi Temple, a Hindu temple, is situated at Edamattom. The temple is managed by NSS Karayogam No.363. The main deity of the temple is Bhadrakali. The major festival, Kumbhabharani.
