= K. M. George, Kayalakakam =

Chief Executive Officer of Palai Central Bank

Kayalakakam Mathai George (1922–2000) was the Chief Executive Officer (CEO) of Palai Central Bank one of the leading Banks in Kerala, India in the middle of twentieth century.

He was born on 12 October 1922. He had his schooling in St Thomas School, Palai and graduated from Loyola College, Chennai. He took his MA and LLB degrees from Bombay University. He became the first MBA degree holder of Kerala when he took the degree from New York University. in 1948. He worked in Palai Central Bank, Palai during 1949-60, initially as an Executive, and later as Secretary and Chief Executive Officer. At the age of 34, he was the youngest CEO of a scheduled bank in India. During his tenure, the bank's business increased by more than 300% from since the time of his joining. He was the President of the Travancore-Cochin Bankers’ Association. He was also one of the founder partners in 1946 of "Kayalackakom Company" Cochin, the first stock & share brokers' firm of Kerala. He moved to Trivandrum in 1972 and was engaged in the development of plantation and industrial ventures including the Premier-Morarji Chemical Co Ltd, Alappuzha. He also regularly contributed articles to financial dailies and journals. He retired from active work in 1990 and died on 25 September 2000.
