= M. K. K. Nair =

Indian Administrative Service Officer

- Born: 29 December 1920; Thiruvananthapuram, India
- Died: 27 September 1987 (aged 66); Ernakulam, Kerala
- Education: University of Madras
- Occupation: Bureaucrat
- Children: 3

Meppally Keshava Pillai Krishnankutty Nair (29 December 1920 – 27 September 1987), commonly identified as M. K. K. Nair, was an Indian bureaucrat, art connoisseur and Indian Administrative Service officer from Kerala. Besides his services in the setting up of Bhilai Steel Plant and in the development of Fertilisers and Chemicals Travancore, Nair was known for his contributions in promoting fine arts and performing arts such as Kathakali, in the state of Kerala.

== Biography ==
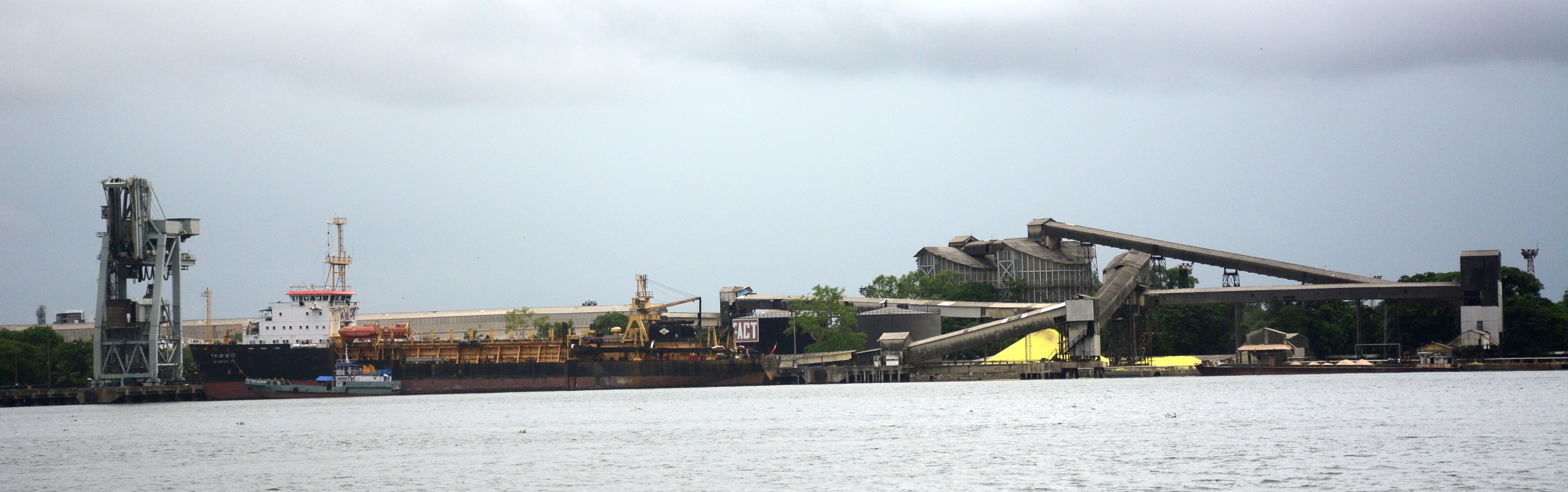
FACT Cochin Division

M. K. K. Nair was born on 29 December 1920 in Thiruvananthapuram, in the south Indian state of Kerala to Kesava Pillai and Janaky Amma. After graduating in physics from the University of Madras in 1939 with first rank, he started his career as a divisional accountant in the civil service of Travancore where he had the opportunity to work under C. P. Ramaswami Iyer, the then Diwan. Later, he worked as an accountant with the telephone department before moving to Secunderabad to join the ordnance factory of the Ministry of Defence in 1943 as a civilian gazetted officer, one among the first four civilian gazetted officers in the British Army and served as a planning officer. He worked at the ordnance factory until 1947 when he quit the job to appear for the Indian Administrative Service examination to join the service in 1949 which brought him in contact with V. P. Menon, a senior IAS officer and a close associate of Sardar Vallabhai Patel.

When the commissioning of Bhilai Steel Plant was getting delayed, the then Indian Prime Minister, Jawaharlal Nehru, on advice from T. T. Krishnamachari who was the Minister of Industries and Commerce at that time, appointed Nair with the responsibility of commissioning the plant which was accomplished in 1959. Subsequently, he returned to his home state of Kerala when he was appointed as the chairman and managing director of the Fertilisers and Chemicals Travancore (FACT) where he stayed until his appointment as a joint secretary in the Planning Commission of India in 1971.

M. K. K. Nair died on 27 September 1987, at the age of 66, at Ernakulam, succumbing to cancer, survived by his wife and their three sons.

== Legacy and honours ==
Nair oversaw the development of Fertilisers and Chemicals Travancore into one of the major industrial units in Kerala; it was during his tenure that a new Ammonium Sulphate plant, FACT Engineering and Design Organisation (FEDO) and FACT Engineering Works (FEW) were set up and the work on the establishment of another production unit in Ambalamedu was started. He developed the FACT community into a self-sufficient one with own schools and hospitals. He was known to have assisted Kathakali artists such as Kalamandalam Hyderali, Kalamandalam Sankaran Embranthiri, Kalamandalam Kesavan and Kalamandalam Neelakantan Nambisan of which Hyderali served as a faculty at the cultural wing of FACT.

Nair wrote his autobiography, Aarodum Paribhavamillathe (With Malice Towards None: The Chronicle of an Era), as a weekly article serial in Kalakaumudi, detailing his experiences during and after his administrative career. The book, while narrating his early administrative days, describes the Indian annexation of Hyderabad, code-named Operation Polo as well as the political differences between Jawaharlal Nehru and Sardar Vallabhbhai Patel. The book was later translated into English by one of his junior colleagues at FACT, Gopakumar M. Nair. The book had another English translation, too, under the title, The Autobiography of a Bureaucrat, and the translation was done by Meena Das Narayan, a writer and the niece of M. K. K. Nair. His life was chronicled as a television series, Smruthi which was broadcast on Safari TV in 2017. The Kerala Management Association has instituted an annual lecture, M. K. K. Nair Memorial lecture in his honour and a community centre in Eloor, the place where he spent the later days of his career, MKK Nair Memorial Community Hall has been named after him. M. K. K. Nair Foundation, an eponymous organization in his name, has instituted an annual award, M. K. K. Nair Award, for recognising excellence in performing arts.

== CBI case and acquittal ==
In 1974, cases were registered against him by the Central Bureau of Investigation alleging abuse of power and corruption. The trial court exonerated him in 1983 and the appeal court acquitted him in 1987, shortly before his death. Years later, D. Babu Paul, a former chief secretary of the Government of Kerala, while delivering the M. K. K. Nayar Memorial lecture, revealed that Nair was being harassed at the behest of a former prime minister of India who happened to come to know about the disparaging comments that Nair had recorded in his personal diary.

== Bibliography ==
- Aarodum Paribhavamillathe (DC Book) by M. K. K. Nair
- M. K. K. Nair (24 February 2014). Story of an Era Told Without Ill-will. Translated by Gopakumar M. Nair. DC Books. p. 355. ISBN 978-93-81699-33-1.

== See also ==
- Political integration of India
- Mir Osman Ali Khan
- V. J. Kurian
- Syed Ahmed El Edroos
