= Vijnaana Rathnaakaram =

Indian literary magazine

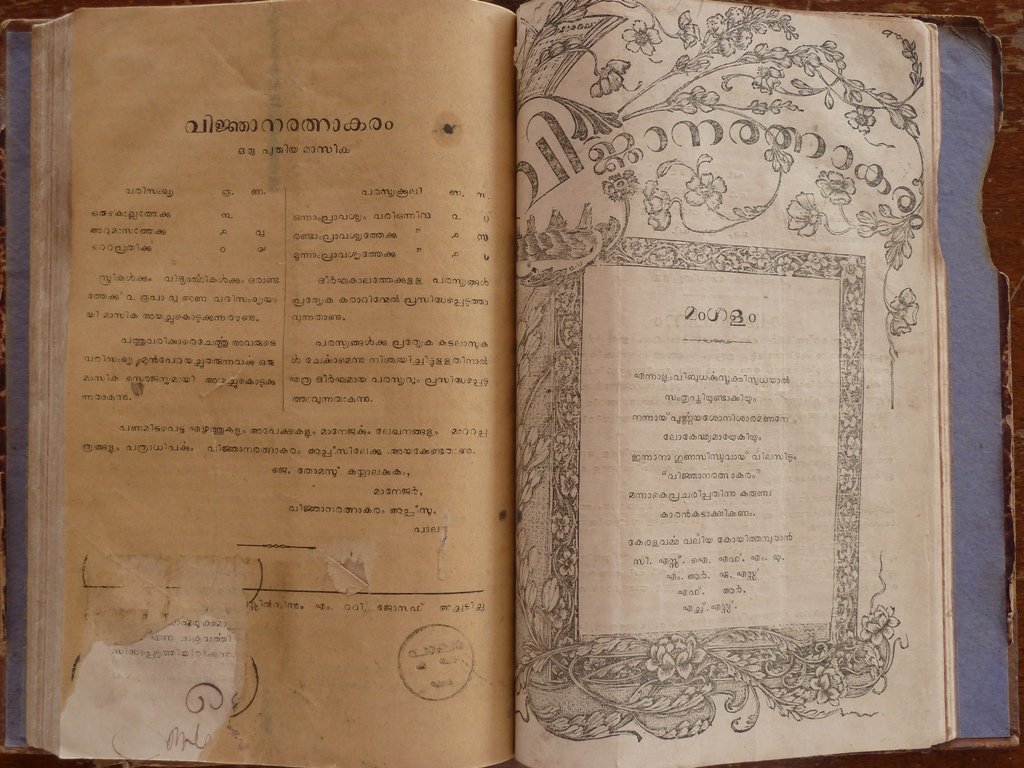
An opening Page of the Magazine depicts "Best Wishes" from Kerala Varma Valiyakoyi Thampuran

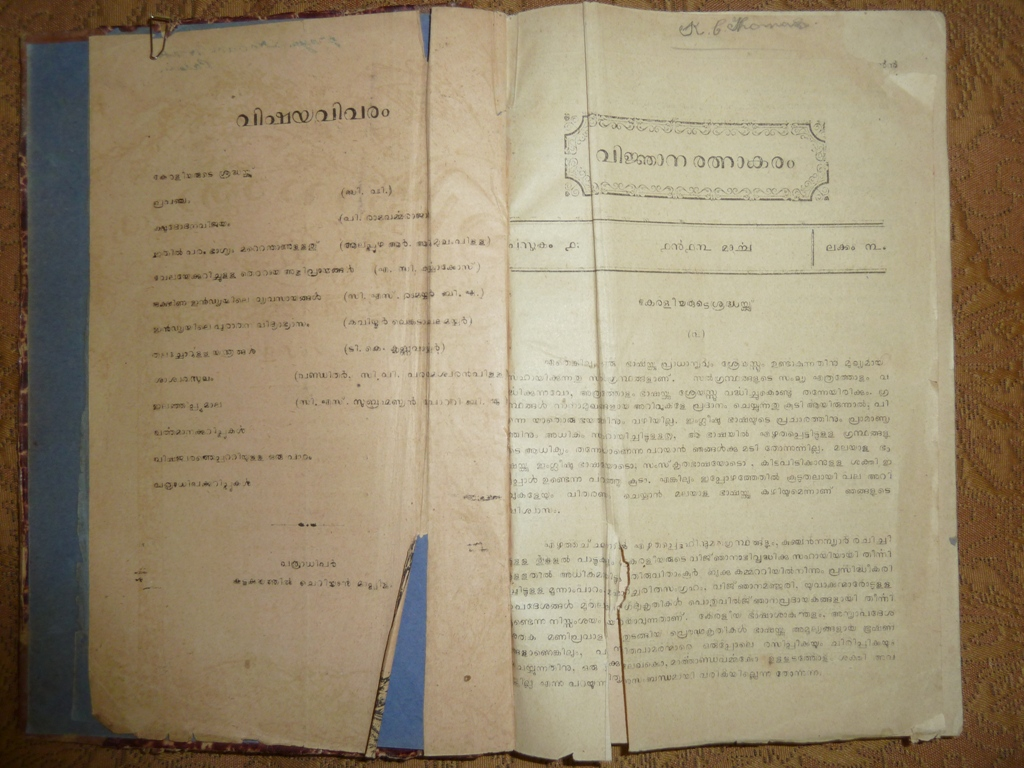
Here C V Raman Pillai is shown as the first contributor on the Contents page

Vijnaana Rathnaakaram was a literary magazine started in 1913 in the old Native State of Travancore, India. J Thomas Kayalackakom was its founder publisher and Mahakavi Kattakayam Cherian Mappillai was its Editor. It was the second literary magazine of Travancore, and one of the early such publications in Malayalam language. Contributors in the magazine included Kerala Varma Valiyakoyi Thampuran, C V Raman Pillai, A. R. Rajaraja Varma, Ulloor S. Parameswara Iyer, and Vallathol Narayana Menon, K. C. Kesava Pillai.
