= Places of worship in Pala =

Places of worship in Pala include both Christian churches and Hindu temples in Pala in the Indian state of Kerala.

== Churches ==
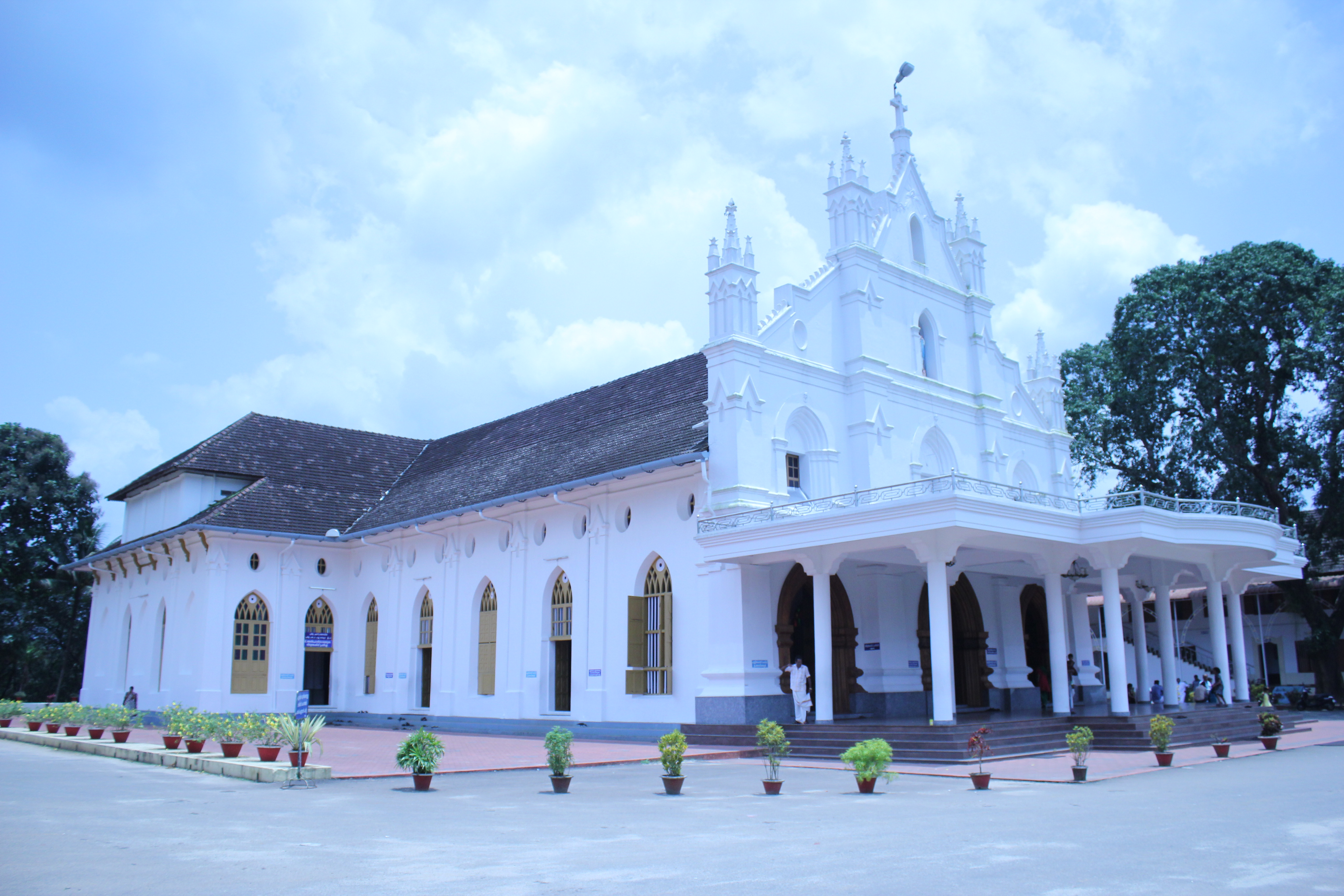
Bharananganam Church

St. Mary's Shrine (Jubilee Shrine) also Known as Pala Kurishupally is a shrine located at the town's centre and is a major landmark. St. Thomas Syro-Malabar Catholic Cathedral, Pala and St. Mary's Syro-Malabar Catholic Church, Lalam are two of the main Syrian Catholic churches there.

Alphonsa Church is a pilgrim centre nearby at Bharananganam, where the remains of St. Alphonsa are kept. Adjacent to it is St. Mary's Syro-Malabar Catholic Church of Bharananganam which was founded in 1002. and St. Augustine's Syro-Malabar Catholic Church at Ramapuram, where the remains of the Blessed Thevarparampil Kunjachan are kept, and St. George's Syro-Malabar Catholic Church is another Christian pilgrim centre Monastery of Mutholy was founded by Saint Kuriakose Elias Chavara.

St. Thomas Church at Arunapuram is a Syro-Malabar Catholic Church, which has the largest number of convents in the Pala Diocese. Two main colleges of Pala are part of this church.

Pala has been a traditional stronghold of Syro-Malabar Catholic Christians, who are generally conservative. Later, a few Evangelical/ Pentecostal churches opened in and around the region. A few Roman Catholic churches are present. Other Syrian Christian denominations are largely absent.

The churches in Pala under the Syro-Malabar Eparchy of Palai are

- St. George’s Church, Lalam Puthenpally
- St. Thomas Syro-Malabar Catholic Cathedral, Pala
- St. Mary's Syro-Malabar Catholic Church
- St. Joseph's Church, Kizhathadiyoor
- St. Thomas Church, Arunapuram
- St. Sebastian's Syro-Malabar Church, Nelliyani

== Temples ==
Eleven temples are present in Pala Municipality. Kadappattor Mahadeva Temple is situated on the bank of Meenachil River and is the best-known temple in the region. Lalam Mahadeva Temple is also well-known and is called Dakshina Kasi (Kasi of South). Lalam Mahadeva Temple is situated on the bank of Lalam River. Kizhathadiyoor Puthiyakavu Devi Temple, Chembittambalam Kizhathadiyoor Thrukkayil Mahadeva Temple, Murikkumpuzha Devi Temple, Idayattu Bala Ganapathy Temple, Narasimha Swami Temple, Vellappattu Sree Vana Durga Bhagavathy Temple, Thattarakathu Bhagavathy Temple, Ooraasala Subrahmanya Swami Temple and Anakkulangara Bhagavathy Temple, Kochidappady Sree Shanmugha Swami Temple are the other temples within the boundaries of Pala Municipality.
