= D. Babu Paul =

Indian civil servant (1941–2019)

Daniel Babu Paul
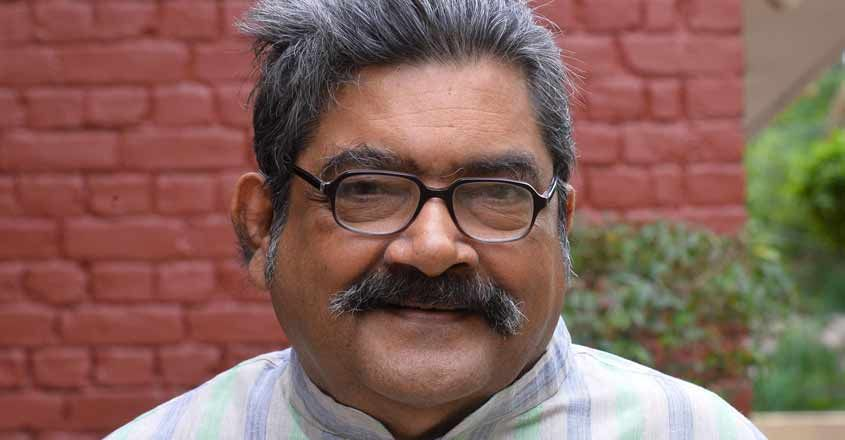
- Former Additional Chief Secretary
- Born: 11 April 1941
- Died: 12 April 2019 (aged 78); Thiruvananthapuram, Kerala, India
- Education: Union Christian College, Aluva; College of Engineering, Trivandrum
- Occupations: Civil Servant IAS; Writer; Orator

Dr Daniel Babu Paul (11 April 1941 – 12 April 2019) was an Indian civil servant, writer, member of the Indian Administrative Service (IAS) All-India rank 7 from the Batch of 1964 and member Ombudsman for local self-government institutions of Kerala during 2000–2001. He was the Former Finance Secretary, Government of Kerala. He retired in the rank of Chief Secretary.

He was a member of Kerala Infrastructure Investment Fund Board (KIIFB).

The State Government of Kerala has decided to establish a Research Centre to perpetuate the memory of Late Dr D. Babu Paul, who has served the state in various capacities. Further, it would also rename the Civil Service Academy after him.

== Personal life ==
D. Babu Paul was born to Fr. Paulose Cheerothottam Kor Episcopa, a Jacobite priest and headmaster, and Mary Paul, a teacher on 11 April 1941. His brother is K. Roy Paul IAS, a former member of UPSC. He was a rank holder in class X (10th grade) and completed his Pre-degree from Union Christian College, Aluva. After his bachelor's degree in civil engineering from College of Engineering, Trivandrum. He secured 7th rank (All India) in the Civil Service Examination and 1st rank in South India.

He died on 12 April 2019, at the age of 78. His death came a day after his 78th birthday.

His wife Anna Nirmala Babu Paul (1943–2000), was the former president of YWCA Trivandrum and secretary of The Trivandrum's Women Club. She was also a member of the Central Board of Film Certification. He is survived by children Cherian Paul and Mariam Joseph.

== Career ==
The most notable period of his career was the initial years in the service. Following the special directive of then chief minister C Achutha Menon, he had overseen the work of the Idukki reservoir, considered Asia's biggest arch dam. The diligence with which he oversaw the project had won him accolades.

Babu Paul held the following offices:

- Additional Chief Secretary, in the rank of Chief Secretary of State [1998–2000]
- First Member, Board of Revenue, and Principal Secretary to Government, Tourism, Information and Cultural Affairs, in the rank of Chief Secretary
- Principal Secretary to Govt, Tourism, Information & Cultural Affairs [1996–1998]
- Second Member, Board of Revenue, in charge of Land Revenue and Transport Commissioner Secretary to Government, General Education [1988–96]
- Chairman, Cochin Port Trust [1984–88]
- Finance Secretary, Kerala State [1982–84]
- Secretary to Government, Transport, Fisheries and Ports [1980–82]
- Expenditure Secretary, Kerala State [1979–80]
- Chief Executive, State Road Transport Corporation [1977–79]
- Managing Director, Travancore Titanium [1975–77]
- Project Coordinator, Idukki Hydel Project & District Collector [1971–75]
- District Collector, Palakkad [1970–71]
- Managing Director, Handloom Development Corporation [1968–70]
- Sub Collector Assistant Collector [Under Training]
- Vice Chancellor of Kerala University
- Lecturer in Civil Engineering;

He continued to maintain good relationships with Chief Ministers of Kerala including Pinarayi Vijayan and Oommen Chandy. “Only a handful of civil servants had made a mark in the administrative circle. Among them, only a few had excelled both as an administrator and literary figure. Babu Paul was one of them. His hallmark was that he approached everything with an inquisitive mind. He never behaved as though he knew everything under the sun. For aspiring civil servants and those who are in service now, his life is worthy of emulation" Pinarayi stated during a commemoration function.

== Books and writings ==
Babu Paul published his first book at the age of 19. The book Oru Yathrayude Ormakal was written in memory of his trip to Europe to participate in the International Students' Conference. His Autobiographical Service story "Katha Ithuvare" was published in 2001. He is the writer of the first Malayalam Bible Dictionary Veda Sabda Rathnakaran. He also wrote - A Queen's Story: Five Centuries of Cochin Port. He has written various other English and Malayalam books.

A list of books authored by him includes:

- 1962 Oru Yatayude Ormakal
- 1971 Utharasyam Disi
- 1976 Giriparvam
- 1980 Kremlin Berlin
- 1980 Eee Paara Mel
- 1986 Nippon no omoyde
- 1988 Achan, Achan, Acharyan
- 1997 Socrateesum Sundaran Nadarum
- 1997 Vedasabdaratnakaranm
- 1998 Pralayangalude Pralayangalude
- 2003 Ennu Ezhutappettirikkunnu
- 2004 Aluvappuzha Pinneyum Ozhukunnu
- 2004 Nilavil Virinja Kappippookkal
- 2004 Eee Muttathu Oru Mullassery Undayirunnu
- 2007 Pallikkentinu Palliikkoodam
- 2008 Katha Itu Ware
- 2009 Pattom Mutal Oommen Chandi Ware
- 2009 Ormakalku Seershakamilla
- 2009 Sambhavami YugeYuge
- 2009 Yatrakkidayil
- 2010 Chila Cheria Valiya Karyangal
- 2010 Kuttikalude Bible
- 2011 Anurananam
- 2011 Rekhayanam
- 2012 Goodbye VS
- 2012 Ormakalude Padippura
- 2012 Ulpathirahasyam
- 2013 Viswasapramanagal Veekshanaviharangal
- 2013 Francis Weendum Wannu
- 2014 Kristubhagavadgita
- 2014 Vocabur Fransiscos
- 2015 Nanmayilekkoru Teerthadanam
- 2016 Aksharangal Nakshatrangal
- 2017 Bibililekkoru Kilivatil

== Awards ==
Babu Paul received numerous awards for his Bible dictionary, Veda Shabda Ratnakaram. They are as follows: Honorary Doctorate from Damascus St. Efraim Unity; Gundert Award presented by International School of Dravidian Languages for the best dictionary in Dravidian language; Guruvayoor Nair Samajam Award; Alexander Marthoma Award; N V Sahitya Puraskaram; Samskara Deepam Award by Indian Institution of Christian Studies, and a fellowship conferred by the same; Christian Literary Award, Kerala History Association Award for Queen's Story which is the history of Cochin port; Sophia Award for the total contribution in the field of culture; MAGA Award from the Malayali Association for his contributions to the cultural development of Kerala; M. K. K. Nair Award for exhibiting interest in temple arts; Bar Eto briro Award (The highest a lay man can aspire for in the Syrian Orthodox Church, the only recipient in India); Rajiv Gandhi Award for his excellence in Civil Service.

A man with deep knowledge in theology, Paul was bestowed the Kerala Sahitya Academy Award for ‘Veda Sabda Ratnakaram’, a comprehensive Biblical lexicon in . He was a motivating force behind the State Civil Service Academy, constituted for providing coaching classes to civil service aspirants.

Awards received by him include the following

- Forala History Association Award for the work, A Queen's Story Five Centuries of Cochin Port
- Kerala Sahitya Akademi Award for Vedasabdaratnakaram
- ISDL's Gundert Award
- NVSahitya Puraskaram
- YMCA Ernakulam
- Christian Reformation Literature Society
- Samskaradeepam Award
- Fellowship of the Indian Institute for Christian Studies
- KCBC Media Award
- Faith Award
- Vedaratnam Award
- Kudumbaratna Puraskaram
- C Sankaranarayanan Media Award for the Best Columnist (2013)
- Fr. Vadakkan Award
- Marthoma Mathews I Award
- World Malayali Council Award (2015)
- Panditaratna Puraskaram
- Tunchan Smaraka Samiti Acharyavandanam
- Guruvayoor Nair Samajam Award
- Paramacharya Puraskaram (2012)
- Kerala Cultural Award
- M. K. K. Nair Award (2000)
- Travel Agents Association of India Award
- Valiyadivanji Raja Kesavadasan Award
- Rajiv Gandhi Award (1999)
- Vaikom Muhammed Basheer Puraskaram
- Sukumar Azhikode Smaraka Puraskaram (2017)
- Musaliar Award (2018)
- Fine Arts Society Fellowship (FAS Perumbavoor)
- Sri Mahalakshmi Puraskaram (2017)
- Janasewa Puraskaram (2012)
- Alexander Marthoma Award (1998)
- Sophia Award
- Navaratri Trust Award (2018)

== Sources ==
- Babu Paul’s life worthy of emulation, says Pinarayi Vijayan
- Ex-bureaucrat Babu Paul laid to rest with full state honours
- Kuruppampady bids adieu to its favourite son
