= Palai Central Bank =

Commercial bank headquartered in Kerala, South India

Palai Central Bank was a commercial bank headquartered in Kerala, South India that operated between 1927 and 1960. Although it was started in a small, remote city, the bank grew to become not only the largest bank, but one of the largest institution in Kerala and the 17th largest among the 94 scheduled banks in India. At that time, the bank's network consisted of 25 branches, with six located outside the state, notably in Mangalore, Madras, and Delhi. Deposits, which were approximately ₹77,000 in 1928, were at ₹9.84 crores by 1960. The Kerala High Court in 1960 ordered the liquidation of the Palai Central Bank on a petition from the Reserve Bank of India.

The Registrar of Companies lists its earliest date of incorporation in 1901. From the time of its founding in 1927, Palai Central Bank had an eventful history. The bank's existence was during the period preceding and immediately following India's independence when Kerala – a small state in the far south – exerted very little influence in national policy. It was also a period when the need to protect the interests of different segments of society was not a major consideration when the central government made policy decisions.

== Beginning ==
Joseph Augusti Kayalackakom founded The Central Bank Limited in Pala, a small town in the central part of the then-native state of Travancore, which later became part of Kerala. His uncle, Augusti Mathai Kayalackakom, provided the start-up capital. Joseph Augusti, who belonged to a family of agriculturists and traders, had operated other businesses before he entered banking. He had run a textile business, initially in Pala and later in Thiruvananthapuram (Trivandrum) in 1908; he also established a bus service in Thiruvananthapuram from 1910 onwards.

The bank was incorporated under the Travancore Companies Regulation (1092) with the following persons as the initial Promoter-Directors:-

- Chairman: Augusti Mathai Kayalackakom
- Mg. Director: Joseph Augusti Kayalackakom
- Directors: Outha Ouseph Thottumkal, Varkey Ouseph Vellookunnel, Cheriyathu Thommen Menamparambil, George Joseph Kottukappallil and Jacob Cherian Maruthukunnel

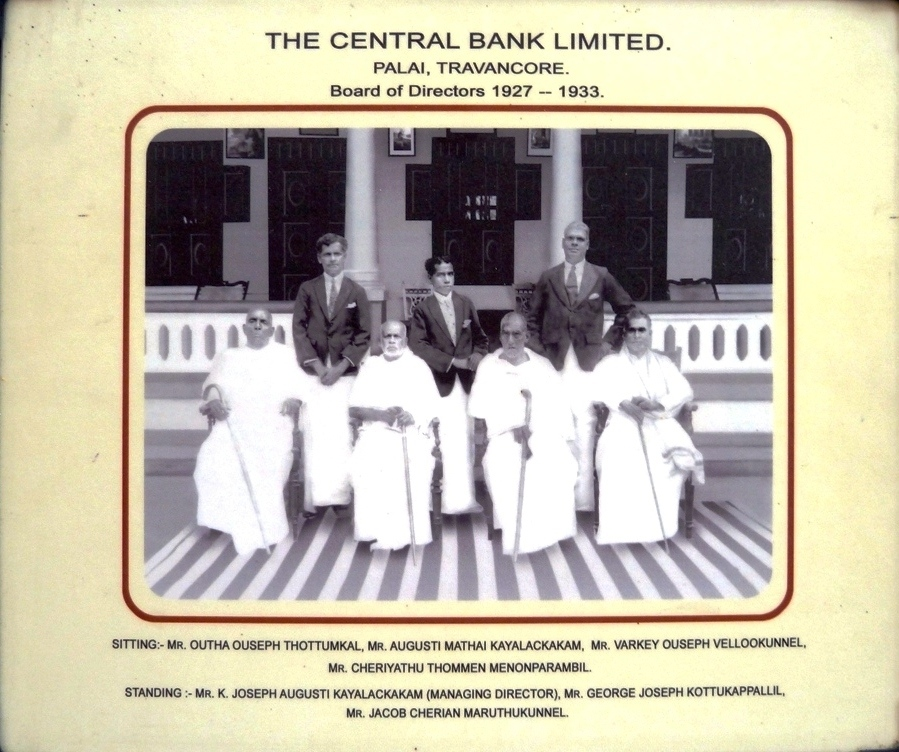
The first Board of Directors of the Palai Central Bank which operated from 1927 to 1960

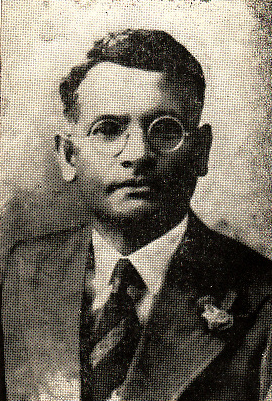
Joseph Augusti Kayalackakom

The bank was on a growth track right from the beginning. Its style of functioning was quite different from the other banks of the day. It was more of 'mass banking' than the 'class banking' practiced by other banks of those days. This was a welcome change for the people who, for their needs, had largely depended on small moneylenders, most of whom were from Kalladaikurichi in Tamil Nadu. The Tamilians were charging exorbitant rates of interest on loans.

In 1929, when the Great Depression struck and Travancore's plantation sector was badly hit, the bank gave liberal assistance to the plantations. The bank, which later changed its name to Palai Central Bank, started expanding its activities by opening branches in several places. When the bank opened a branch in New Delhi, India's new capital city 1932, it was the very first bank to do so, ahead of even the established north-Indian banks. The bank also had a branch in Aluva (Alwaye) a major industrial town.

In 1935, the bank introduced electricity in its head office building in Pala by installing an oil-powered generator, years before the Government's first power project was commissioned at Pallivasal and electricity became common. The bank was also a pioneer in introducing modern advertising, which was quite different from the advertisements of other banks of the day.

== Dominant position ==
In 1935, George Thomas Kottukapally, the brother of Director George Joseph Kottukappally, became a Director of the Palai Central Bank. As the Travancore Debt Relief Act was coming into existence in 1937, one of the first directors of the bank, Jacob Cherian Maruthukunnel, was nominated to the Sree Chitra State Council to pilot the relative Debt Relief Bill, as it was expected that banks would be affected by the Act.

In 1937, two of the major banks of Travancore – Travancore National Bank and Quilon Bank merged to form Travancore National and Quilon Bank (TN&Q bank), the 4th largest bank in India. However, in the very next year, it was liquidated on the orders of C. P. Ramaswami Iyer, Dewan of Travancore. This led to the collapse of more than 60 small banks. However, Palai Central Bank, which was the leading bank at the time, remained unaffected.

In 1940, industrialization received a boost as power supply was started in Travancore from the Pallivasal Project, and a stream of industries like FACT, Travancore Ceramics, Kundara were started. In 1945, the State had another milestone in banking as the State Bank of Travancore was started.

With India's independence in 1947, the first popular government assumed power in Travancore in 1948, with Pattom Thanu Pillai as Chief Minister. The new Chief Minister told the bank's management that with the dawn of independence, the bank could make a major contribution to nation-building. The bank rose to the occasion, taking the leadership in subscribing to government bonds for large amounts. Development projects of the State that the bank financed included the construction of the Trivandrum-Nagercoil Cement Concrete Road, which now forms part of NH-66. The Bank, using its enormous influence, played a role in bringing the Municipality to Pala in 1947, beating the claims of some other towns nearby.

In the 1940s, the bank enjoyed an unprecedented financial position and influence. The chief editor of Malayala Manorama Daily spoke in a TV interview (decades later) about the Palai Central Bank management helping their founder Mammen Mappilai – who was struggling to revive the newspaper – by offering to take over the paper as a whole or to invest in its shares, as a friendly gesture of Joseph Augusti towards a close family friend. Eventually, an investment of 20% in shares was made.

In 1948, K M Joseph Kayalackakom – who had become a director of the bank in 1940 following the death of his father and the first chairman of the bank, Augusty Mathai – moved from Trivandrum to the bank's head office at Pala. He then became the virtual General Manager of the institution.

In 1947, at a time when there were no management schools anywhere in the British Empire, Joseph Augusti sent his cousin KM George to the United States for management studies. KM George took his MBA degree from New York University in 1948, thus becoming the first MBA degree holder in Travancore. In 1949, he joined the bank as an executive. He was to become the secretary and chief executive officer of the bank later.

In the late forties, it was found that during the previous few years, the institution had drifted and slowed down from its previous spectacular growth rate. Officials who had the charge of advances had not been successful in controlling subordinates sufficiently to ensure discipline over the making of advances. Several advances had proved to be doubtful, although their percentage in total advances was not high. Strict discipline was now enforced. A series of innovative schemes were also introduced, which brought not only order to the bank but also set it on a course of further rapid growth.

In 1949, the Reserve Bank of India (RBI) was nationalized, and the Banking Companies Act came into existence (later renamed as Banking Regulation Act). This legislation gave RBI complete control over commercial banks. As RBI entered the picture, it continuously pursued the question of the old doubtful advances of the bank through its inspection reports. One of the inspection reports of RBI had then alleged: "Many of the advances granted by the Manager of the bank's Madras branch (George Joseph Kottukappaly), who also happened to be one of its directors, had turned sticky. He and his wife owed the bank nearly Rs 13.5 lakhs in the form of clean advances, and although he repeatedly flouted the head office's directions, it was unable to exercise effective control over him in view of his dual capacity ...." However, RBI was satisfied with the bank's subsequent operations.

In 1950, when a new Diocese of the Catholic Church was formed in Pala, it was an open secret that the bank was the prime mover in bringing the Diocese to Pala. Joseph Augusti led a delegation that accompanied the new Bishop Mar Sebastian Vayalil to Rome for the investiture ceremony. The bank also took a keen interest in extending assistance to the initial ventures of the new Diocese of Palai. In 1953, the bank had the honor of giving a grand reception to Eugene Tisserant, Dean of Vatican's Sacred College of Cardinals, at the residence of the managing director in Palai during the Cardinal's historic visit to Kerala.

The Pala Diocese, along with Pala Municipality, functioned as vehicles of development of the town, adding to what the Bank had been doing for two decades.

In 1953, George Thomas Kottukapally, who was still a director of the bank, became a member of parliament. Even after that, he continued to be a director. In the same year, when A. J. John (who had become Chief Minister of the integrated Travancore–Cochin State) resigned, he accepted the bank's invitation to join its board of directors.

== Hurdles ==
In January 1955, the ruling Indian National Congress party, at their national conference held at Avadi in Tamil Nadu, passed the resolution to establish socialism in India "where the principal means of production are under social ownership or control." As the implementation of this began and the nation started moving along the socialist path, in that year, the Government of India nationalized the Imperial Bank of India and formed the State Bank of India. In January 1956, life insurance was nationalized, and the Life Insurance Corporation of India was formed. In 1957, with a view to further advancing socialism, four new taxes were introduced in the country, viz. Wealth Tax, Expenditure Tax, Capital Gains Tax and Gift Tax.

Palai Central Bank had by then emerged not only as the biggest enterprise in Kerala – bigger than all the private and public undertakings and banks in the State – but also as the 17th largest bank in the country, bigger than even some of the State banks. From 1956 onwards, RBI started turning down the banks' repeated requests to open new branches. In 1956, when RBI asked for the communal break-up of the bank's depositors, not many could foresee what was to follow.

Even without branch expansion, the bank was, however, making steady growth. With a view to strengthening the caliber of its executives, KM Mathai was sent for training to the US at the Kings County Trust Company and the First National City Bank of New York (Citibank), as well as at Midland Bank in the UK. K M Ignatius, another executive, was trained at the First National City Bank of the US.

In March 1957, H V R Iyengar became Governor of RBI. He had succeeded B Rama Rau, who resigned due to differences with the Finance Minister after a long period of nearly eight years in office. Iyengar's tenure as Governor was a tumultuous period in the history of Indian banking.

The year 1956 saw the birth of Kerala State, and a year later, in 1957, Kerala registered another first by voting to power the world's first communist government to be elected through the ballot box. Meanwhile, in Delhi, Jawaharlal Nehru's two finance ministers resigned in quick succession and Morarji Desai became the new Finance Minister in March 1958. Nehru soon became aware of Desai's adamant and uncompromising attitude.

In 1959, seven banks controlled by the erstwhile native states – including the State Bank of Travancore – were nationalized by the Government of India and made subsidiaries of the State Bank of India. Towards the end of that year, RBI, under the influence of the north Indian bankers' lobby, initiated a series of steps in the Palai Central Bank. These steps, taken with the stated object of improving the bank's working, were apparently aimed at wrecking the institution. It asked Joseph Augusti to retire from the bank's board of directors. Also, K M George was asked to step down from the post of chief executive officer and to continue as Secretary of the bank. An outsider – an official of the State Bank of India – was appointed as the bank's new chief executive officer. Following these moves, some of the bank's depositors lost confidence in the institution and withdrew their deposits. Some people felt that RBI wanted to create a crisis in the bank to facilitate its closure. However, the crisis did not occur as the run on deposits soon ceased, and some of the depositors even made re-deposits.

== Banking crisis ==
In February 1960, a new ministry assumed office in Kerala with Pattom Thanu Pillai as Chief Minister. In August of that year, the Governor of RBI succeeded in persuading Desai to close the Palai Central Bank, which, he told him, had too many doubtful advances. That RBI gave misleading and false data to convince him is something that Desai himself would come to know only much later. The fact that all the doubtful advances were more than a decade old and related to the period before the introduction of the Banking Regulation Act was not conveyed to him.

RBI moved the application in Kerala High Court for the winding up of the bank under Section 38(3)(b)(iii) of the Banking Regulation Act, 1949. It may be noted that the Banking Regulation Act does not allow the High Court to go into the merits of RBI's application but specifies that the Court "shall order the winding up" if an application is made by RBI. Also, RBI can move an application if, in the opinion of the RBI, "the continuance of the banking company is prejudicial to the interests of its depositors", which is a rather vague provision. Justice P T Raman Nair, the presiding Judge of the Kerala High Court, ordered the winding up on 8 August 1960.

After the winding up, Desai vehemently defended his action in Parliament. He, however, had to admit later that the reasons earlier stated were not correct.

A banking crisis followed the liquidation of the Palai Central Bank. Most of the banks in the State faced a run on their deposits. Even some of the banks outside Kerala were affected. The total deposits of all the 339 commercial banks in India stood at Rs. 20218.4 million in 1960. Out of the 339 commercial banks, 94 were Scheduled Banks, and 245 were Non-Scheduled Banks. The total deposits of all the 94 scheduled commercial banks, which was Rs. 19719.7 million before the crisis, fell by more than 10% to Rs. 17418.0 million in the 6 months following the crisis. Punjab National Bank, the worst affected among the northern Banks, received special support. However, the affected Kerala banks were less lucky. They were amalgamated with other banks in the state or outside.

When the closure of the State's largest bank also led to a crisis in the entire banking system, there was a hue and cry in all quarters, including the press. But out of sheer obstinacy, Desai refused to reconsider the matter. When a group of Kerala MPs met Nehru requesting that the bank be revived, he told them that he would like to, but his insistence would lead to the resignation of Desai. He said there was a feeling that finance ministers did not thrive under him and so he did not want another resignation. In the larger interests of the nation, he asked the Kerala MPs to put up with the whole thing. When Chief Minister Pattom Thanu Pillai met Desai to make a personal appeal, he cut him out by asking how much money he had lost. A furious Pattom Thanu Pillai told him that, like Desai, he was also a true Gandhian, and he had never had a bank account in his life. He then angrily walked out. With that, all doors for a revival from the Government side were closed.

A legal battle was then fought. However, the delay in the legal process made a revival impossible. In the Supreme Court, the bank's case was argued, among others, by Gopal Swarup Pathak, who later became vice-president of India. The court ruled in a 3–2 judgment that with the delay, a revival has been rendered infructuous. The Directors of the Bank also faced legal suits, although they were later exonerated by the Kerala High Court. One of the Directors, George Thomas Kottukappaly, also went through a public examination by the High Court..

After the closure of the bank, the first impression of the public was that Palai Central Bank had failed. They assumed foul play. When the Finance Minister of the country stated in Parliament that the bank's deposits had hardly 15% asset backing, the people had no reason to disbelieve. They had to wait for years to know that even after bearing several years of liquidation expenses, the depositors got more than 90% of their money – but in petty installments. The people knew only then that as a going concern, the bank could very well have repaid its depositors fully.

About 30 years later, in the early 1990s, when banks in India faced a crisis of mounting losses and high levels of non-performing assets, an interviewer asked a now-retired Justice P T Raman Nair about his thoughts on the winding-up order of Palai Central Bank three decades ago. He then remarked that today's banks were in much worse condition and that if the current yardstick were applied Palai Central Bank would not have been ordered to be closed.

In Volume II of the History of RBI covering the years 1951–1967, a 27-page appendix viz. "Appendix C: The Palai Central Bank" extensively covers the history of the bank. The following is an extract:

"While defending the Reserve Bank as 'one of the best central banks in the world' maintaining a 'high level of efficiency,' the Prime Minister, Jawaharlal Nehru, was reported to have acknowledged that it may have made a 'mistake' in closing down the Palai Central Bank.

"Defending the (Reserve) Bank's action, the (RBI) Governor recalled the representations received from the Kerala Bankers' Association and the Travancore-Cochin Banking Inquiry Commission to 'go slow' on refusing licences to banks in Kerala and pointed out that if the (Reserve) Bank had taken the action it had now taken in any of the previous three years, it would have been subject to even greater criticism. 'This has been the considered judgement of my colleagues and myself in the Bank.' However, (Governor) Iengar conceded, 'someone else could have exercised his judgement differently.'"

The crisis that shook the country's banking sector led to some changes in that sector. The demand for protecting the interests of depositors in the event of similar crises led to the passing of the Deposit Insurance Act by Parliament in 1961 and the eventual formation of the Deposit Insurance & Credit Guarantee Corporation (DICGC). Another demand arose from the allegation that RBI is a bureaucratic institution insensitive to the needs of the banking sector. Its advocates called for the formation of a Superintendent of Banking like that in the US to carry out the function of supervision of banking in the country. This demand was partially met years later when the Government introduced a policy to appoint a career banker as one of the Deputy Governors of RBI.

== Bibliography ==
- T K Velupillai – Travancore State Manual – Travancore Government Press – 1940
- History of the Reserve Bank of India – Volumes I & II – Oxford University Press
- A Sreedhara Menon – A Survey of Kerala History – D C Books – 2008
- Manorama Year Book (1965 Edition) – Malayala Manorama Publications.
- K M Joseph – Pala Innale Innu ['Palai Yesterday and Today' in Malayalam] – Deepanalam Press – 1981
- Banking Regulation Act, 1949 – Government of India.
- Selected Banking Indicators 1947-1997 – Reserve Bank of India
- H R Manchiraju – Modern Commercial Banking – New Age International Publishers – 2008 – ISBN 978-81-224-2622-9
- Rajani A Jadhav – Research Paper on History of Indian Banking System
- Report of the Travancore-Cochin Banking Enquiry Commission – Manager of Publications, Government of India – 1956
