= Kizhaparayar =

Village in Kottayam District, Kerala, India

Coordinates: 9°41′46″N 76°42′36″E

Kizhaparayar is a small village in Kerala state, India. It is part of the Meenachil Panchayat in Kottayam district. The village situated on the banks of the Meenachil River. There is no traces when the first settlement came to this village. It is a sparsely populated place. Kizhaparayar borders with Edamattom in the south, Palakkadu in the north, and Pala in the west. On the other side of the river is Bharananganam.

The major agriculture is rubber. There are also coconut and tapioca cultivation. The other agricultural products include cocoa and areca nut. There are few small paddy fields also. The main income of the people comes from rubber plantations and related jobs.

There are no major business activities in and around Kizhaparayar.

People belongs to 2 religious faiths – Roman Catholicism (Syrian Christians) and Hinduism. The local parish is St. Gregory's Church, which is situated at the center of the village. A convent, a government clinic, a co-operative bank and a few shops in the vicinity of the church form the small township. There is a small latex processing unit also running, which allows the rubber owners to sell latex. There are 2 temples also in Kizhaparayar.

The nearest town is Pala which is about 4 km from Kizhaparayar. In December 2000, a sequence of earthquakes occurred in the area, with the epicentre estimated to be between Pala and Kizhaparayar. The earthquakes continued into January 2001.
