= Amparanirappel =

- village
- Location in Kerala, India Amparanirappel (India)
- Coordinates: 9°41′0″N 76°44′40″E
- Country: India
- State: Kerala
- District: Kottayam

Languages
  - Official: Malayalam, English
- Time zone: UTC+5:30 (IST)
- Postal code: 686578
- Vehicle registration: KL-35

Amparanirappel is a place near Palai in Kottayam district of Kerala, India.

== Location ==
It is located on the outskirts of Bharananganam, a renowned pilgrimage center. Nearby towns are Palai and Erattupetta.

== Economy ==
Major plantation in this area is rubber. The Meenachil river flows along one side of Amparanirappel. It is the home land of First Engineering & Technology monthly in Malayalam"Engineers World". Amparanirappel is located in Poonjar assembly constituency seat. Since Thidanadu panchayat is a part of Pathanamthitta Parliament seat, the place belongs to that constituency.

== Nearby places of interest ==
- Bharananganam
- Palai
- Vagamon

== Home Stays in the area ==
- Planters Home Stay
