= Pravithanam PM Devasia =

Malayalam poet and teacher

Pravithanam PM Devasia was a Malayalam poet. He penned five Christian Mahakavyam. His best known works are Israel Vamsam and Rajakkanmar. He was a teacher by profession. He led a very austere life and received many accolades for his work. He died at the age of 93.

== See also ==
- Palai
