= Kathrikadavu =

Kathrikadavu കതൃക്കടവ്
- neighbourhood
- Location in Kerala, India
- Coordinates: 9.983°N 76.296°E
- Country: India
- State: Kerala
- District: Ernakulam

Languages
  - Official: Malayalam, English
- Time zone: UTC+5:30 (IST)
- PIN: 6820**
- Telephone code: 0484
- Vehicle registration: KL-07
- Nearest city: Kochi
- Lok Sabha constituency: Ernakulam

Kathrikadavu is a region in the city of Kochi, in the state of Kerala, India. It lies almost midway between the two major intersections (junctions) in Kochi, namely Kaloor and Kadavanthra. Kathrikadavu is mainly a residential area, though of late more and more commercial establishments are being set up here.

Kaloor-Kadavanthra Road, one of the three north–south arteries in the city of Kochi passes through Kathrikadavu. One of the main advantages of Kathrikadavu, is the ease of access to other areas of Kochi city from here. Kaloor and Kadavanthra are at the north and south ends of the Kaloor-Kadavanthra road, while Padma Junction and MG Road can be accessed easily by following the Pullepady road to the west side of Kathrikadavu. Thammanam and NH47 bypass can be accessed by following the Thamannam-Kathrikadavu road towards east.
