= Thammanam =

Thammanam തമ്മനം
- Ward
- Location in Kerala, India
- Coordinates: 9.984°N 76.310°E
- Country: India
- State: Kerala
- District: Ernakulam
- Established: http://wikimapia.org/1287873/Thammanam

Government
  - Type: Local Govt.
  - Body: Kochi Municipal Corporation
- Elevation: 9 m (30 ft)

Languages
  - Official: Malayalam, English
- Time zone: UTC+5:30 (IST)
- Postal code: 682032
- Vehicle registration: KL- 7

Thammanam is a ward of Kochi, Kerala. The ward is classified as per official records as a suburban residential area within the Kochi city limit and falls under the Kannayanur taluk. Thammanam can be claimed to lie at the heart of the city, and is equidistant from crucial city junctions, namely Palarivattom and Vyttila. The Palarivattom-Vyttila connection road passes through Thammanam, and meets Ponnurunni and Pipeline Junction as well. Thammanam is connected to the commercial hub of Kochi, MG Road via Thammanam-Pullepady Road which is situated at a distance of around 5 km, by a convenient road network through Kathrikkadavu. The region is also situated just a km from the main National Highway of Kerala connecting Thiruvananthapuram in the south to Kasaragod in the north of Kerala.

The city's prime locations lie within a radius of 6 km from Thammanam, making it a predominantly residential and commercial area with modern facilities in and around the city region.

== People ==
Thammanam being connected to the main points of the city, has always enjoyed a position as a suitable residential area. The convenience of reaching the railway station, a major highway network running in parallel, and the presence of artillery roads, has in recent times led to the development of housing colonies, flats, apartments, hotels and restaurants that have benefitted from the patronage of the local population. The population of Thammanam has in recent years exploded, with a majority of the newcomers comprising migrants from different parts of the State, as well as from other parts of the country. Small-time hotels like Yuva and Binnamma's Kitchen have grown in fame for their unique style of cooking traditional dishes, and are often seen as part of the evolving food cooking trends in the city.

Major banks like State Bank of India, Union Bank of India and South Indian Bank have also opened their branches in the last couple of years. There is also a reading club and the famous DD Retreat Club a few metres from the main junction.

The region is known for its peaceful harmony and has a Church, a Temple and a Mosque along a stretch of just half a kilometre; characteristic of the religious tolerance of Kerala societies.
