= J. Thomas Kayalackakom =

Indian politician (1888-1972)

J. Thomas Kayalackakom (1884–1968) was a politician and businessman of the Travancore-Cochin State of pre-independent India (which became part of Kerala after India's independence). He was an elected member of the Sree Moolam Popular Assembly. Sree Moolam was one of the earliest popularly elected legislatures on the Indian sub-continent, in 1904, which first met 21 October 1905.

He was later a successful businessman; his ventures included a rubber plantation, the first Malayalam literary magazine, and stocks in the Madras Stock Exchange.
