= Pala, Kerala =

Pala
- Municipality
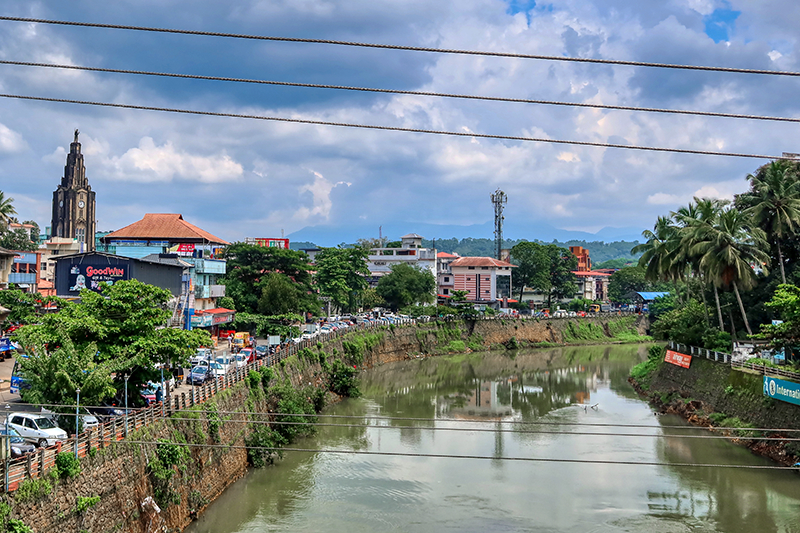
- Pala town

- Location within Kerala Location within India
- Coordinates: 9°42′47″N 76°41′00″E
- Country: India
- State: Kerala
- District: Kottayam

Government
  - Type: Municipality
  - Body: Pala Municipality
  - Municipal Chairperson: Maya Rahul
  - Member of the Legislative Assembly of Kerala (MLA): Mani C. Kappan

Area
  - Total: 16.06 km^{2} (6.20 sq mi)
- Elevation: 31 m (102 ft)

Population (2011)
  - Total: 22,056
  - Density: 1,373/km^{2} (3,557/sq mi)

Languages
  - Official: Malayalam, English
- Time zone: UTC+5:30 (IST)
- PIN: 686573, 686574, 686575
- Telephone code: +9148 22
- Vehicle registration: KL 35, KL 67
- Nearest city: Kottayam
- Vidhan Sabha constituency: Pala
- Lok Sabha constituency: Kottayam

Pala (IPA: [paːlaː]) is a municipality in the Kottayam district of Kerala, India. It is located 28 km (17.4 mi) north of the district headquarters in Kottayam and about 167 km (103.8 mi) north of the state capital Thiruvananthapuram. Pala also serves as the headquarters of Meenachil Taluk. As per the 2011 Indian census, Pala has a population of 22,056, and a population density of 1,373/km^{2} (3,560/sq mi).

Pala is on the banks of the Meenachil River and is a major hub of Syrian Christian culture in Kerala.

== Demographics ==
As of 2001 Indian census, Pala had a population of 22,640. Males constitute 49% of the population and females 51%. Pala has an average literacy rate of 98%, higher than the national average of 73%: male literacy is 98.5%, and female literacy is 97.8%, still much higher than the state average. 10% of the population is under 6 years of age. Christians make up 65.09% of the population, Hindus 34.19%, Muslims 0.1%, other religions 0.05% and 0.15% not stated.

Religions in Pala Town (2011)
Religion	Percent
Christianity	65.09%
Hinduism	34.19%
Islam	0.1%
Other or not stated	0.20%

== Politics ==
Pala is generally a stronghold of the United Democratic Front and the Kerala Congress (Mani). K.M. Mani represented the Pala constituency in the Kerala Legislative Assembly from 1965 to 2019, making him the longest-serving legislator in Kerala. After the death of K.M. Mani, the Left Front won the by-election held in September 2019 for the first time in history. This victory was achieved by Mani C. Kappan of the NCP.

Pala is a municipality since its formal inauguration on December 1, 1949. The current municipal chairperson of Pala municipality is LDF-backed Independent Maya Rahul. She replaced UDF-backed Independent Diya Binu Pulikkakandam after an LDF-backed no-confidence motion was passed with support of 17 councillors.

Pala falls under the Kottayam Lok Sabha constituency and Pala Assembly constituency. It is represented by Mani C Kappan in the Legislative Assembly and by K. Francis George in the Lok Sabha.

Ward	Ward Name	Councilor Name	Party	Alliance
001	Paramalakunnu	Adv. Betty Shaju Thuruthel	KC(M)	LDF
002	Mundupalam	Shaju Thuruthen	KC(M)	LDF
003	Market	Josin Bino	Left Independent	LDF
004	Kizhathadiyoor	Sonia Chitted	KC(M)	UDF
005	Plathanam	Georgekutty Cheruvallil	KC(M)	LDF
006	Kanattupara	Sebastian J. Panaikkal	INC	UDF
007	Pulimalakunnu	Jiji Baiju Kollamparambil	KC(M)	LDF
008	Kaveekunnu	Riya Chiramkuzhy	INC	UDF
009	Kochidappadi	Siji Tony Thottathil	KEC	UDF
010	Moonnani	Biju Varikkani	KEC	UDF
011	Monastri	Ruby Anto Padinjarekere	KC(M)	LDF
012	Chethimattom	Tony Thaiparambil	INC	UDF
013	Murikkumpuzha	Biju Pulikkakandam	Independent	Others
014	Parippil Kunnu	Adv. Binu Pulikkakandam	Independent	Others
015	Palapurayidom	Diya Binu Pulikkakandam	Independent	Others
016	Kannadiyurumbu	Tomin Vattamala	KC(M)	LDF
017	12th Mile	Sanil Raghavan	KC(M)	LDF
018	Mukkalikunnu	Lisikutty Mathew Kandathiparambil	INC	UDF
019	Pala	Maya Rahul	Independent	Others (later joined LDF)
020	Lalam	Biji Jojo Kudakachira	KC(M)	LDF
021	Vellappadu	Leena Sunny Purayidom	KC(M)	LDF
022	Arunapuram	Rajitha Prakash	INC	UDF
023	College Ward	Princy Sunny	DCK	UDF
024	Kottaramattom	Biju Mathews	INC	UDF
025	Nelliyani	Biju Palupadavil	KC(M)	LDF
026	Puthenpallikunnu	Roy Francis	CPI(M)	LDF

== Sports ==
The Municipal Stadium is the centre of sports in Pala.

The 61st Kerala State Schools Athletics Championships was held at the stadium in 2017. At least 2500 students from 100 schools attended the sports meet. The 63rd Kerala State Athletics Championship was also held at the stadium in the month of October, 2019.

== See also ==
- Bharananganam
- Kattappana
- Thodupuzha
- Erattupetta
- Cherpunkal
- List of people from Pala
- Places of worship in Pala
- Meenachil
- Meenachil River
- Pala (State Assembly constituency)
- Ullanadu
