= Puthuppally Assembly constituency =

Constituency of the Kerala legislative assembly in India

Puthuppally
- Constituency No. 98 for the Kerala Legislative Assembly
- Puthuppally Assembly constituency

Constituency details
- Country: India
- Region: South India
- State: Kerala
- District: Kottayam
- Established: 1957
- Total electors: 1,76,412 (2023)
- Reservation: None

Member of Legislative Assembly
- 16th Kerala Legislative Assembly
- Incumbent Chandy Oommen
- Party: INC
- Alliance: UDF
- Elected year: 2026

Puthuppally is one of the 140 state legislative assembly constituencies in Kerala in southern India. It is also one of the seven state legislative assembly constituencies included in Kottayam Lok Sabha constituency. As of the 2026 Kerala Legislative Assembly election, the current MLA is Chandy Oommen of the Indian National Congress.

== Local self-governed segments ==
Puthuppally Assembly constituency is composed of the following local self-governed segments:

Sl no.	Name	Status (Grama panchayat/Municipality)	Taluk
1	Akalakunnam	Grama Panchayath	Kottayam
2	Ayarkunnam	Grama panchayat	Kottayam
3	Kooroppada	Grama panchayat	Kottayam
4	Manarcaud	Grama panchayat	Kottayam
5	Meenadam	Grama panchayat	Kottayam
6	Pampady	Grama panchayat	Kottayam
7	Puthuppally	Grama panchayat	Kottayam
8	Vakathanam	Grama panchayat	Changanassery

== Members of Legislative Assembly ==
The following list contains all members of Kerala Legislative Assembly who have represented Puthuppally Assembly constituency during the period of various assemblies:

Year	Name	Political party
1957	P. C. Cherian	Indian National Congress
1960	P. C. Cherian	Indian National Congress
1967	E. M. George	Communist Party of India (Marxist)
1970	Oommen Chandy	Indian National Congress
1977	Oommen Chandy	Indian National Congress
1980	Oommen Chandy	Indian National Congress
1982	Oommen Chandy	Indian National Congress
1987	Oommen Chandy	Indian National Congress
1991	Oommen Chandy	Indian National Congress
1996	Oommen Chandy	Indian National Congress
2001	Oommen Chandy	Indian National Congress
2006	Oommen Chandy	Indian National Congress
2011	Oommen Chandy	Indian National Congress
2016	Oommen Chandy	Indian National Congress
2021	Oommen Chandy	Indian National Congress
2023^	Chandy Oommen	Indian National Congress
2026	Chandy Oommen	Indian National Congress

== Election results ==
=== 1970 ===
1970 Kerala Legislative Assembly election: Puthuppally
Party	Candidate	Votes	%	±%
INC	Oommen Chandy	29784	54.55	
CPI(M)	E M George	22496	41.20	
Margin of victory		7288	13.34	
INC gain from CPI(M)		Swing		

=== 2011 ===
There were 1,57,222 registered voters in the constituency for the 2011 election.

2011 Kerala Legislative Assembly election: Puthuppally
Party	Candidate	Votes	%	±%
INC	Oommen Chandy	69,922	59.74	
CPI(M)	Suja Susan George	36,667	31.33	
BJP	P. Sunilkumar	6,679	5.71	
BSP	Saji K. Cheraman	3,230	2.76	'
Independent	Jayakumar Kavunkal	537	0.46	
Margin of victory		33,255	28.41	
Turnout		1,17,035	74.44	
INC hold		Swing		

=== 2016 ===
There were 1,73,253 registered voters in Puthuppally Assembly constituency for the 2016 Kerala Assembly election.

==== Results by political party ====
2016 Kerala Legislative Assembly election: Puthuppally
Party	Candidate	Votes	%	±%
INC	Oommen Chandy	71,597	53.42	▼6.32
CPI(M)	Jaick C. Thomas	44,505	33.20	▲1.87
BJP	George Kurien	15,993	11.93	▲6.22
NOTA	None of the above	630	0.47	−
Margin of victory		27,092	20.22	▼8.19
Turnout		1,34,034	77.36	▲2.92
INC hold		Swing	▼6.32	

=== 2021 ===
There were 1,75,959 registered voters in Puthuppally Assembly constituency for the 2021 Kerala Assembly election.

==== Results by political party ====
2021 Kerala Legislative Assembly election: Puthuppally
Party	Candidate	Votes	%	±%
INC	Oommen Chandy	63,372	48.08	▼5.34
CPI(M)	Jaick C. Thomas	54,328	41.22	▲8.02
BJP	N. Hari	11,694	8.87	▼3.06
Independent	George Joseph Vathappally	997	0.76	−
BSP	P. P. Abhilash	763	0.58	▼0.10
NOTA	None of the above	497	0.38	−
SUCI(C)	M. V. Cherian	146	0.11	▲0.01
Margin of victory		9,044	6.86	▼13.36
Turnout		1,31,797	77.36	▼2.46
INC hold		Swing	▼5.34	

=== 2023 by-election ===
Kerala Assembly by-election, 2023: Puthuppally
Party	Candidate	Votes	%	±%
INC	Chandy Oommen	80,144	61.38	▲13.3
CPI(M)	Jaick C. Thomas	42,425	32.49	▼8.73
BJP	G. Lijinlal	6,558	5.02	▼3.82
AAP	Luke Thomas	835	0.64	
Independent	Santhosh Pulickal	78	0.06	
Independent	Shaji	63	0.05	
Independent	P.K Devadas	60	0.05	
NOTA	None of the above	400	0.31	▼0.07
Margin of victory		37,719	29.32	▲22.46
Turnout		1,28,624	72.1	▼5.26
INC hold		Swing	▲13.3	

=== 2026 ===
2026 Kerala Legislative Assembly election: Puthuppally
Party	Candidate	Votes	%	±%
INC	Chandy Oommen	84,031	65.56	▲4.18
CPI(M)	K. M. Radhakrishnan	31,124	24.28	▼8.21
BJP	Ravindranath Vakathanam	11,544	9.00	▲3.98
NOTA	None of the above	613	0.48	▲0.17
Margin of victory		52,907	41.28	▲11.96
Turnout		1,28,180		
INC hold		Swing		

Local body-wise vote totals
Local body	No. of booths	UDF	LDF	BJP	Leading alliance	Lead
Ayarkunnam	28	10,740	3,768	1,702	UDF	6,972
Akalakunnam	17	6,775	2,227	1,063	UDF	4,548
Kooroppada	26	10,837	4,244	2,136	UDF	6,593
Manarcad	28	11,938	4,490	1,717	UDF	7,448
Pampady	18	8,451	3,472	892	UDF	4,979
Puthuppally	24	9,586	3,662	970	UDF	5,924
Meenadom	13	5,396	1,697	736	UDF	3,699
Vakathanam	47	18,449	6,971	2,160	UDF	11,478
Total EVM	201	82,172	30,531	11,376	UDF	51,641
Postal ballots	—	1,859	593	168	—	—
Total	—	84,031	31,124	11,544	UDF	52,907

=== Local body elections ===
==== 2025 ====
SEGMENTS	LDF	NDA	UDF	IND		LEADING ALLIANCE
AKALAKKUNNAM	4427	1464	5377	413	11681	UDF
AYARKUNNAM	6546	3528	8588	863	19525	UDF
KOOROPPADA	5942	3763	6104	808	16617	UDF
MANARCAUD	5499	2295	7613	547	15954	UDF
MEENADAM	3422	543	4348	6	8319	UDF
PAMPADY	8090	1532	10813	87	20522	UDF
PUTHUPPALLY	5496	2507	8752	496	17251	UDF
VAKATHANAM	7670	1602	9543	694	19509	UDF
TOTAL	47092	17234	61138	3914	129378	
	36.3987695	13.3206573	47.25532935	3.025243859		

== See also ==
- Puthuppally, Kottayam
- Kottayam district
- List of constituencies of the Kerala Legislative Assembly
