= Eravinalloor =

- village
- Location in Kerala, India
- Coordinates: 9°32′0″N 76°33′0″E
- Country: India
- State: Kerala
- District: Kottayam

Area
  - Total: 5 km^{2} (1.9 sq mi)

Languages
  - Official: Malayalam, English
- Time zone: UTC+5:30 (IST)
- PIN: 686011
- Telephone code: 0481-246...., 235....
- Vehicle registration: KL-05
- Nearest city: Puthuppally

Eravinalloor is a village in the Kottayam district of Kerala, India, situated 9 km (5.6 mi) from Kottayam town. The village is near Puthuppally and is located on the banks of the Kodoor River.

== Geography ==
The small island-like village is surrounded by water. It is connected to the mainland by four bridges: the Puthuppally bridge to Puthuppally, the Eravinalloor bridge to Thrikkothamangalam, the scenic Parakkalkadavu bridge to Kollad lined with acacia trees, and the Panachikkad bridge to Panachikkad. The total area is less than 2 km^{2} (0.77 sq mi).

== Religion ==
The village has five temples of the deities. The Subramanya Swamy Temple has a circular sanctum sanctorum, which is unusual for the Dravidian style of temple architecture. The Panachikad Temple is situated 2.5 km (1.6 mi) away from Eravinalloor. Our Lady of Assumption Church represents the Catholic Church in Eravinalloor.

== History ==
Historically, the land on which Eravinalloor is situated was donated to the Kadamuri Narasimha Swami Temple by the king of Thekkumkur. Eravinalloor was among five villages on the land (the others being Ancheri, Kadamuri, Thrikkothamangalam and Meenadom); the 'lord Narasimha of Kadamuri Temple' was thus known as the 'panchadesadipathi', or lord of five lands.

== Schools ==
There are two educational institutions in Eravinalloor: Century old (1912) lower primary school, situated near the Eravinalloor upper junction, and St. Thomas Upper Primary School (normally called 'Achante School'). St. Thomas Upper Primary School was established by Christian priest Rev. Fr. Kochimoolayil Mani Elias. The Vivekodayam Sanskrit High School, dedicated to the study of Sanskrit, once existed in the village, but it was dismantled in the 1970s.
