= Pannagam thodu =

River in Kerala, India

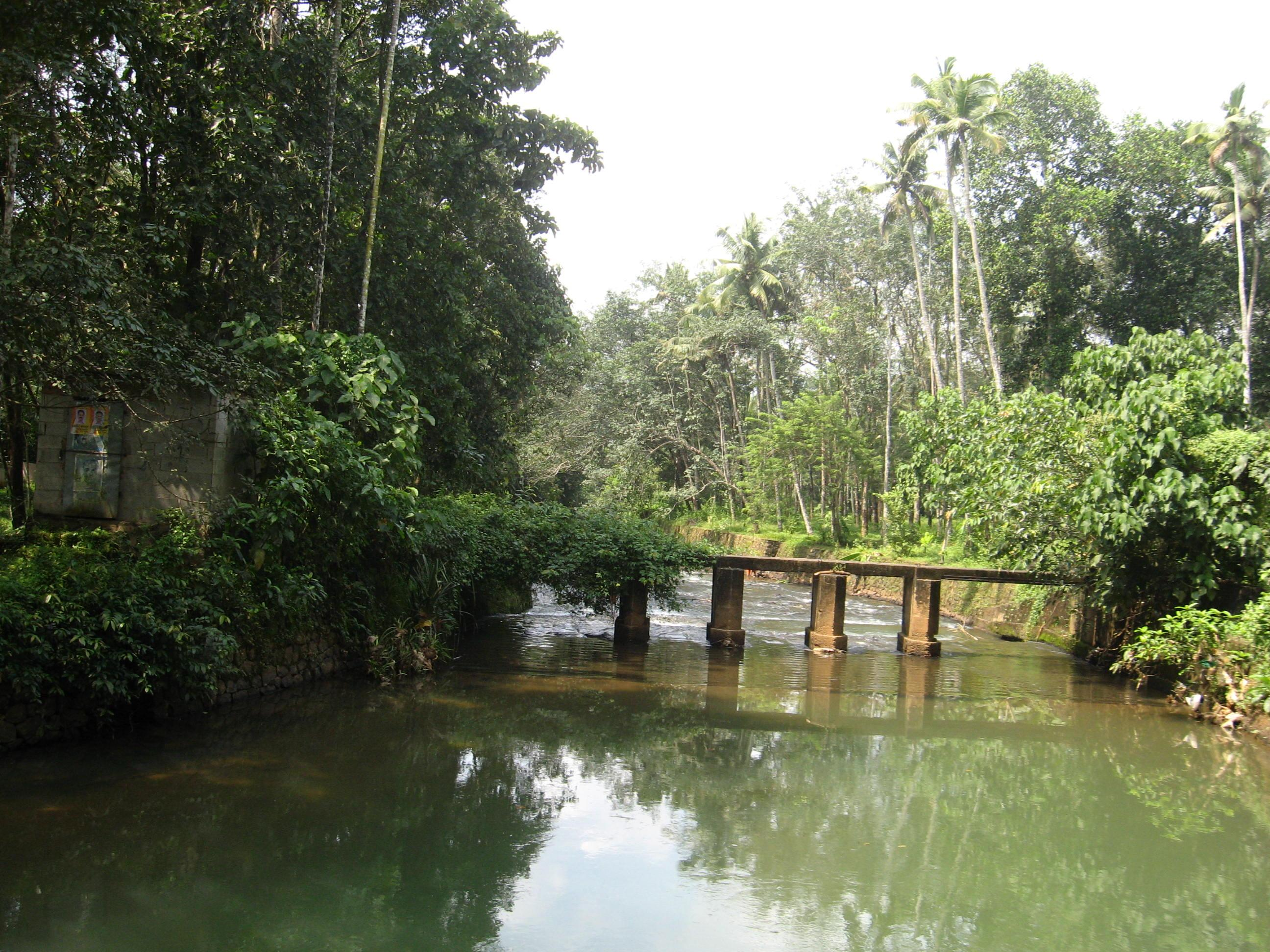
Pannagam thodu

The Pannagam thodu is a river in the state of Kerala in southern India, forming near Madapattu and flowing north for 30 kilometers before joining the Meenachil River close to Punnathara.

Several streams from small hills in the towns of Pampady, Pallickathode, and Kooropada combine near the 14th Mile Church along the Kottayam–Kumily Road to form the Pannagam Thodu, which grows as it flows north through the towns of Madapattu, Mattakkara, Akalakunnam, Arumanoor, and Ayarkunnam.

Pannagam means snake, as the river flows like a curled snake through the many surrounding hills.

== Environmental issues ==
The Pannagam thodu is mostly free from water pollution. There are a few issues affecting the water pollution, mainly from disposal of urban and domestic waste into the streams.

== Economic importance ==
Thousands of farmers use water from the river for agriculture. During the monsoon, the river may be full or even flood over. Illegal sand mining is rare in this river. There are acute shortages of water in summer.

== Bridges and check dams ==
The main bridges are at: Eruthupusza, Myladiyil kadav, Kaniparambu Mattakkara, and Kongandoor (Charathupadi).

The main check dams are:

- Moongakuzhy Check Dam for Lakkatoor drinking water project.
- Kaniparambu Check Dam for Moozhoor drinking water project.
