= Payyappaddy =

Payyappady
- Village
- Location in Kerala, India Payyappady (India)
- Coordinates: 9.567912°N 76.593626°E
- Country: India
- State: Kerala
- District: Kottayam

Government
  - Body: Puthuppally

Area
  - Total: 1.12 km^{2} (0.43 sq mi)

Languages
  - Official: Malayalam, English
- Time zone: UTC+5:30 (IST)
- PIN: 686011
- Telephone code: 91-481-35
- Vehicle registration: KL-
- Nearest city: Kottayam
- Lok Sabha constituency: Kottayam
- Civic agency: Puthuppally

Payyappady is a small village in Puthuppally panchayat in Kottayam district of Kerala state, India.

== Etymology ==
Payyappady means "Slowly Sung" in Malayalam. There are no legends behind this name.

== Temples ==
This small village is famous for Hebron Christian Brethren Church, Sri Lakshmaswamy Temple, Vennimala & Sree Dharmasastha temple Malakunnam and St. Stephen's CSI Church. St. Thomas Orthodox Church Vellukutta is another famous church near here.

== Suburbs and villages ==
Aaraattuchira, Kochumattam, Vennimala, Cheramkulam, Malakunnunam, Mundiyakkal, Akkamkunnu, Puthuvel etc. are the nearby small villages and considered as a part of it. The place is mainly hilly, contains small streams and ponds. Rubber, Banana, Pepper are main agriculture products.

== History ==
Ithihyamala Published by Kottarathil Sankunni details the legend behind the Venniamala temple and historical importance of the village.

== Schools & colleges ==
- Govt. LP School Cheerankulam.
- Govt. Middle School Kochumattam.
- College of Applied Science, IHRD, Payyapady, Puthuppally.
- CMS LP school, Payyappady

== Local festivals ==
1) Vennimala Temple Annual Aaraattu Festival is one of the major festivals. A procession is hosted at the temple Arratuchira stream during this festival.

2) Karkida Vavu Bali at Vennimala Temple

RASSA

3) St. Thomas Orthodox Church Vellukutta celebrates annual festival (Mayalatho) on 1 Feb and 2 Feb. A procession will be held from Kochumattam to Kanjirathamoodu during this time.

4) Vennimala Sreedharmasastha Temple Mandalam chirappu .

5) St. Stephen's CSI Church, Payyappady, harvest festival is celebrated every year on 26 December. On the eve of this day, a procession moves from the church to CMS LP school and returns to the church. During this harvest festival day, auctions of "first harvest" agricultural items are held.

6.Hebron Christian Brethren Church is conducting six-day v.b.s. every year on April third week. Since it has conducted 20th year v.b.s.

== Tourism ==
Vennimala temple is situated at the summit of a hill which rises 1,500 ft above sea level. The height offers views and opportunities for cycling and trekking.

Close to the Vennimala temple is a cave with historical importance to the local area, with many stories citing the cave.

Public buses are available to Payyappady from Kottayam via Puthuppally every fifteen minutes - this journey is 10 km. Trekking and rikshaw travel to the Vennimala temple is possible from Payyappady and Payyappaddy junction respectively.

== Notable people ==
- Vettom Mani, Malayalam author
