= St. George Orthodox Church, Puthuppally =

പുതുപ്പള്ളി പള്ളി St. George Orthodox Valiya Pally Puthuppally
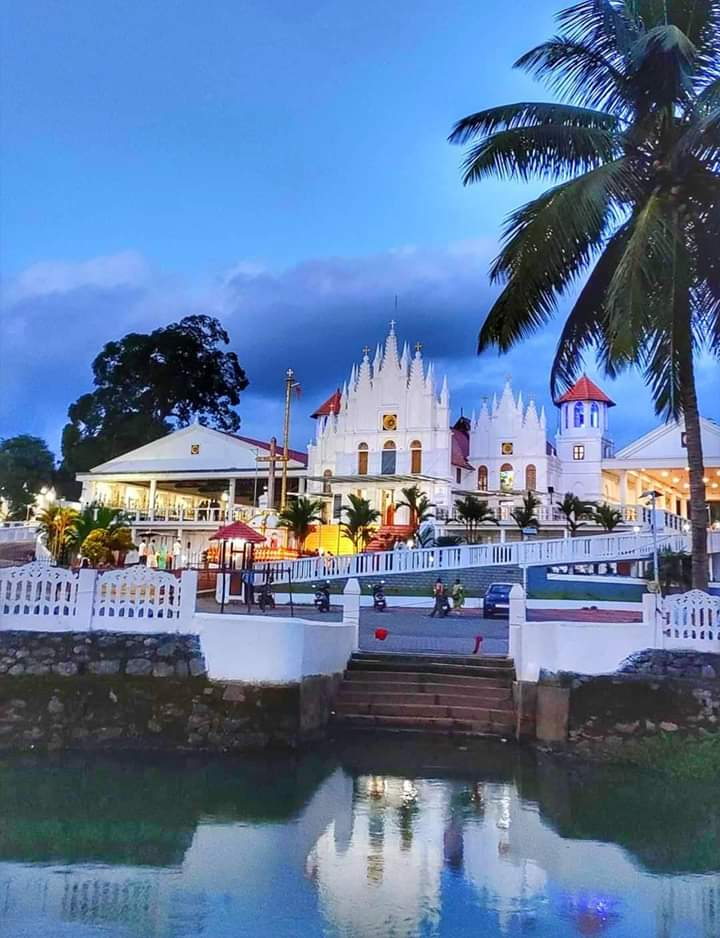
- പുതുപ്പള്ളി പള്ളി St. George Orthodox Valiya Pally Puthuppally
- Denomination: Malankara Orthodox Syrian Church
- Tradition: Malayalam

History
- Founded: AD 1557

Administration
- Diocese: Kottayam Diocese

St.George Orthodox Church Puthuppally (Puthuppally Valiya Pally) is a prominent church that belongs to the Malankara Orthodox Syrian Church. This church is situated beside the Puthuppally - Changanassery road about a kilometre from the Puthuppally junction, on the eastern bank of the Kodoor river. The surrounding areas of church are panoramic and very beautiful. The old church was well preserved church with wall murals dating back to ancient times. These unique wall murals have been painted using vegetable dyes. The church is the final resting place of Shri Oommen Chandy, who served as the former Chief Minister of Kerala.

== Puthuppaly Perunal (The Feast of St. George) ==
=== Kodiyet (flag hoisting) ===
Ten days before the feast two arecanut palm flag masts, one each from Puthuppally and Ericadu hamlets are brought to Puthuppally junction and; from there they are carried to the church in a ceremonial procession by a large crowd with orchestral accompaniment. Both the flag masts are erected in front of the church; the flags are blessed and hoisted by the priest and hailed by crowd. The next ten days are very hectic. "Chendamelam" (traditional orchestral drum beatings), "Kathinaveddi" (native cannon shots) at the foot of the flag masts, daily morning Qurbana (the holy mass), "Sandhyanamaskaram" (evening prayers) in the church and; in between, other allied programs in the church premise are the salient feature during these days.

=== Virakedeel, Vechoot and Nercha Vilampu ===
Virakedeel (Fire Wood Collection and Procession), Vechoot (Mass Luncheon) and Nercha Vilampu (Offerings Distribution)

Thousands participate in the main feast on 7 May. After the holy mass, it is customary to provide meals to the devotees (Vechoot). Devotees bring children on this day for their first rice feed at the hands of priests (Adya choroonu). After "Raza" (ceremonial procession) in the afternoon "Nercha Vilampu" (rice flour bread and chicken distribution) is done. As per age old practice devotees bring live fowls as offerings particularly during this feast. Chicken is prepared out of the same and served along with the appam brought as offerings by the devotees. Firewood for preparation of the above items is offered and collected from Puthuppally and Ericadu hamlets and brought in ceremonial procession to the church exactly in the same way as the flag masts are brought. This is known as "Virakideel". The cooking starts in the early hours of the main feast day.

=== Rasa (Ceremonial Procession) ===
The gold cross is taken out and after traditional prayers and rites it is placed on the main altar after holy mass on 6 May. On the same day evening processions from the "Kurisin Thotty" (Cross Towers) at Kochalummoodu and Parackal Kadavu proceed towards Puthuppally church and reach there at about 8pm. From there a larger procession of devotees carrying Wooden cross, Gold cross, Silver crosses, Muthukudas (Artistic umbrellas), Flags, Lit up candles etc. with traditional orchestral accompaniments is taken out. The procession passes through Kuttenchirapaddy, Nilackal pallypaddy and reaches the "Kurisin Thotty" at Puthuppally junction, where prayers are held, reaches Puthuppally pally at about 9 PM and ends with prayers and blessing. People on the route greet it in front of their houses or shops with wick lamps and candles before an intercessor’s photo, and they are blessed by the main priest in the procession.

=== Deepa Kazhacha (Light Display) Karimarunnu Prayogam (Fire works) ===
The paddy fields in front of the church are usually flooded in May. Thousands of wick lamps are lit and floated in coconut shells in these waters on the evening of 6 May before the processions. The feast ends with a firework display soon after the procession.

== Notable fathers of the Church ==
- Paret Mathews Mar Ivanios was a member of the church and served as priest
- Narimattathil Yuhanon Mar Severios served as a priest.

== Institutions run by the church ==
- St. George L.P. School, Angady, Puthuppally
- Georgian Public School, Puthuppally

== Gallery ==
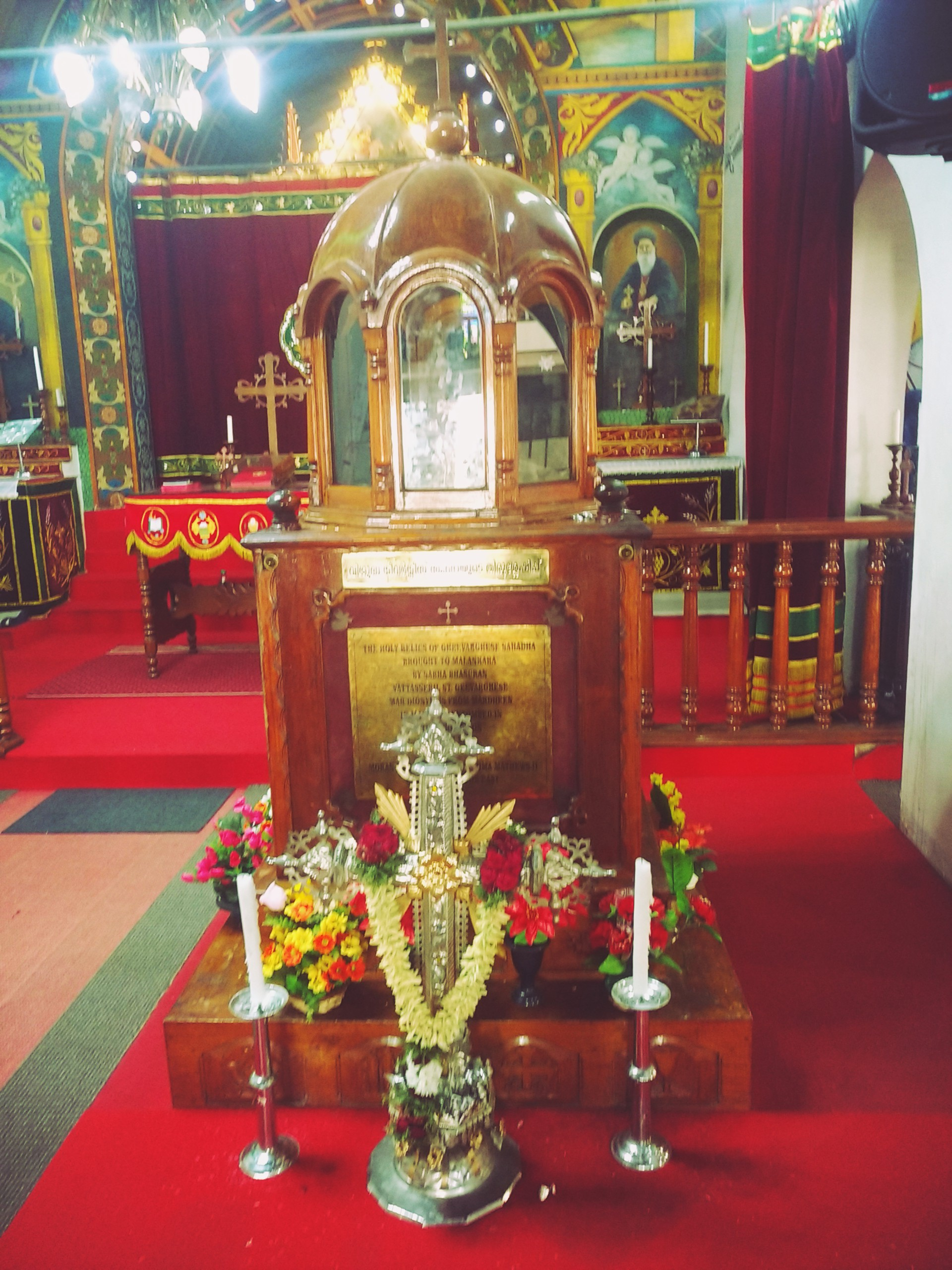
Relics of St. George

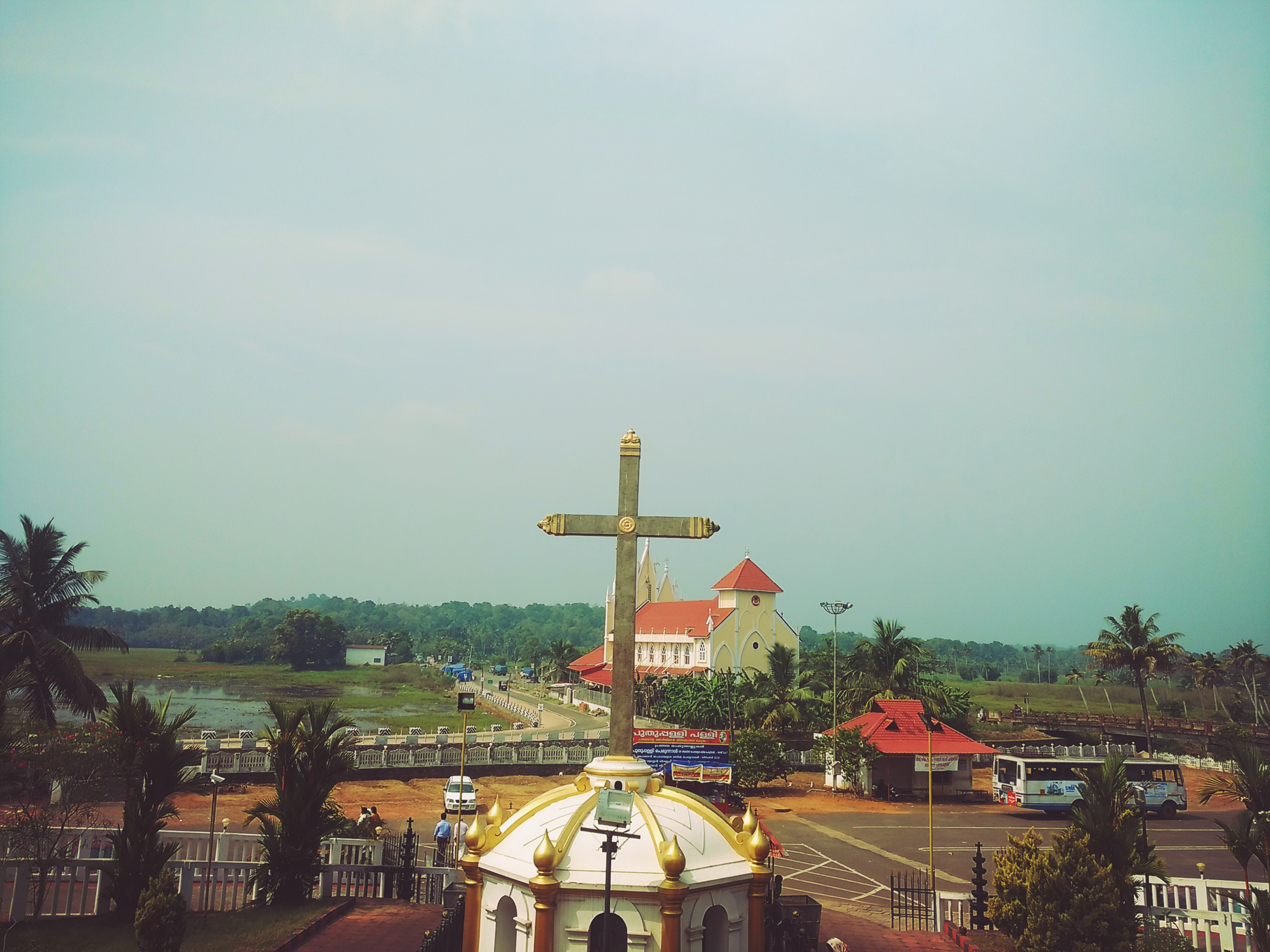
View from top of Church

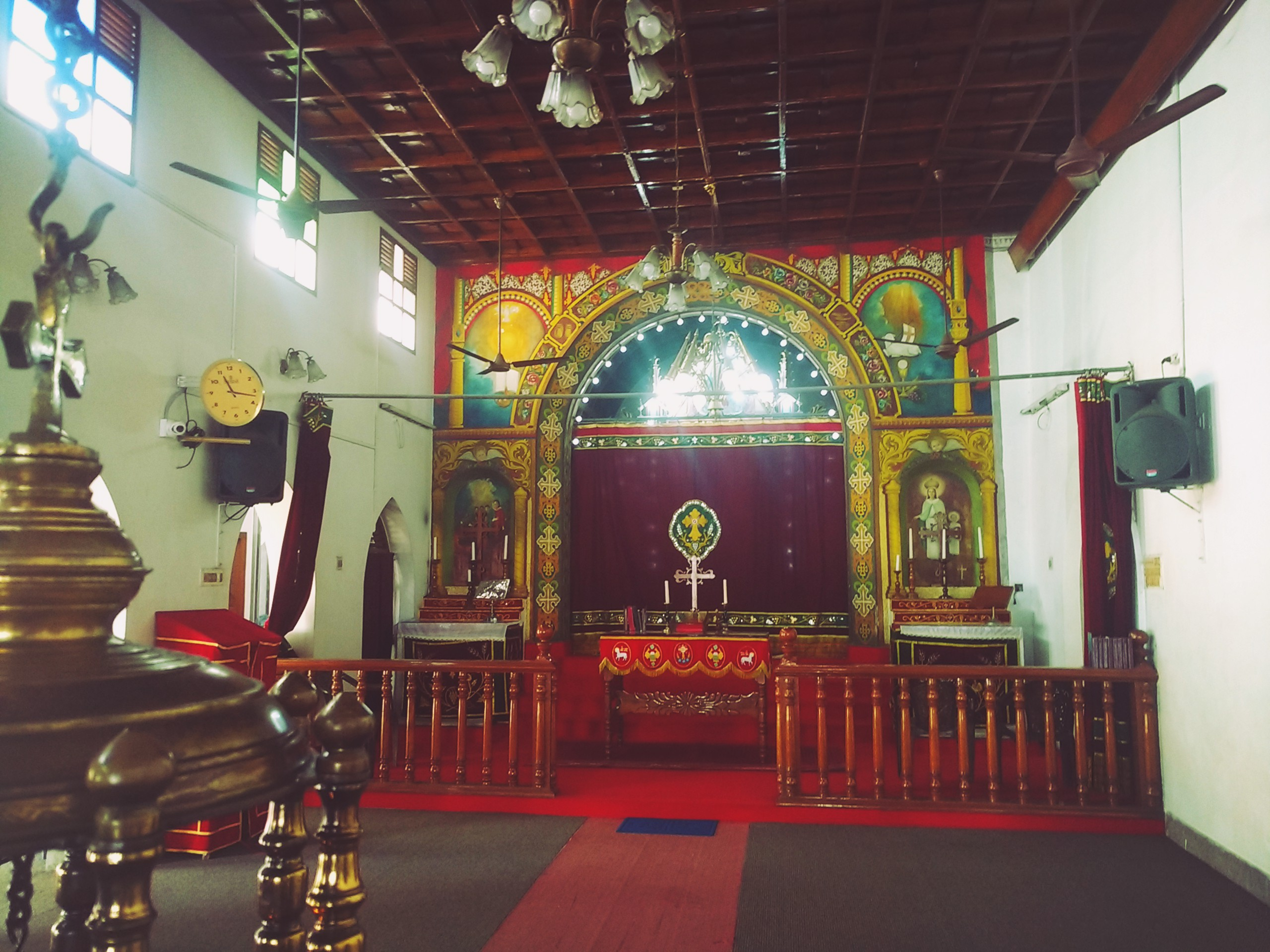
Altar

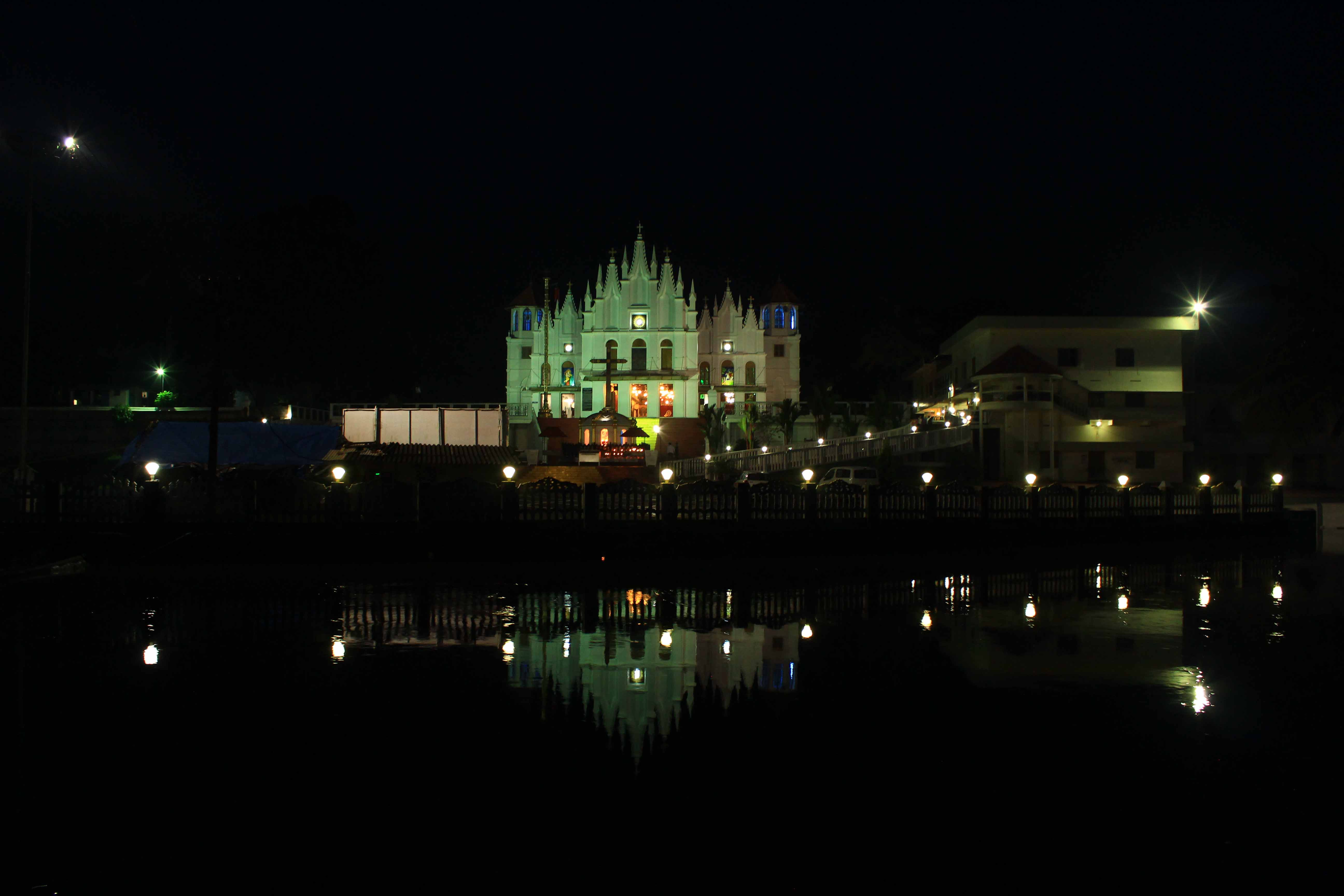
Night View

== See also ==
- Saint George: Devotions, traditions and prayers
