= Madapattu =

Madappattu is a rural region in Kooroppada Panchayat in Kottayam district, Kerala. The famous attractive place is Madappattu Devi Temple. The pannagam thodu which flows through in front of the temple. In this area the Aruvikuzhy thodu are famous. Madappattu devi temple is just half a kilometer from erthuvuzha jn. The nearest places are kooroppada, pamapady, pallickathodu and pala. Madappattu in spite of being well connected by roadways, is a beautiful, calm and quiet place to live-in. SBT Kooroppada Branch is the nearest landmark. Madappattu or madappadu is near to schools, temples, church and hence is a proper place to live a peaceful family life. Mainly people are depended on Rubber plantation.
