= Mattakkara =

- Village
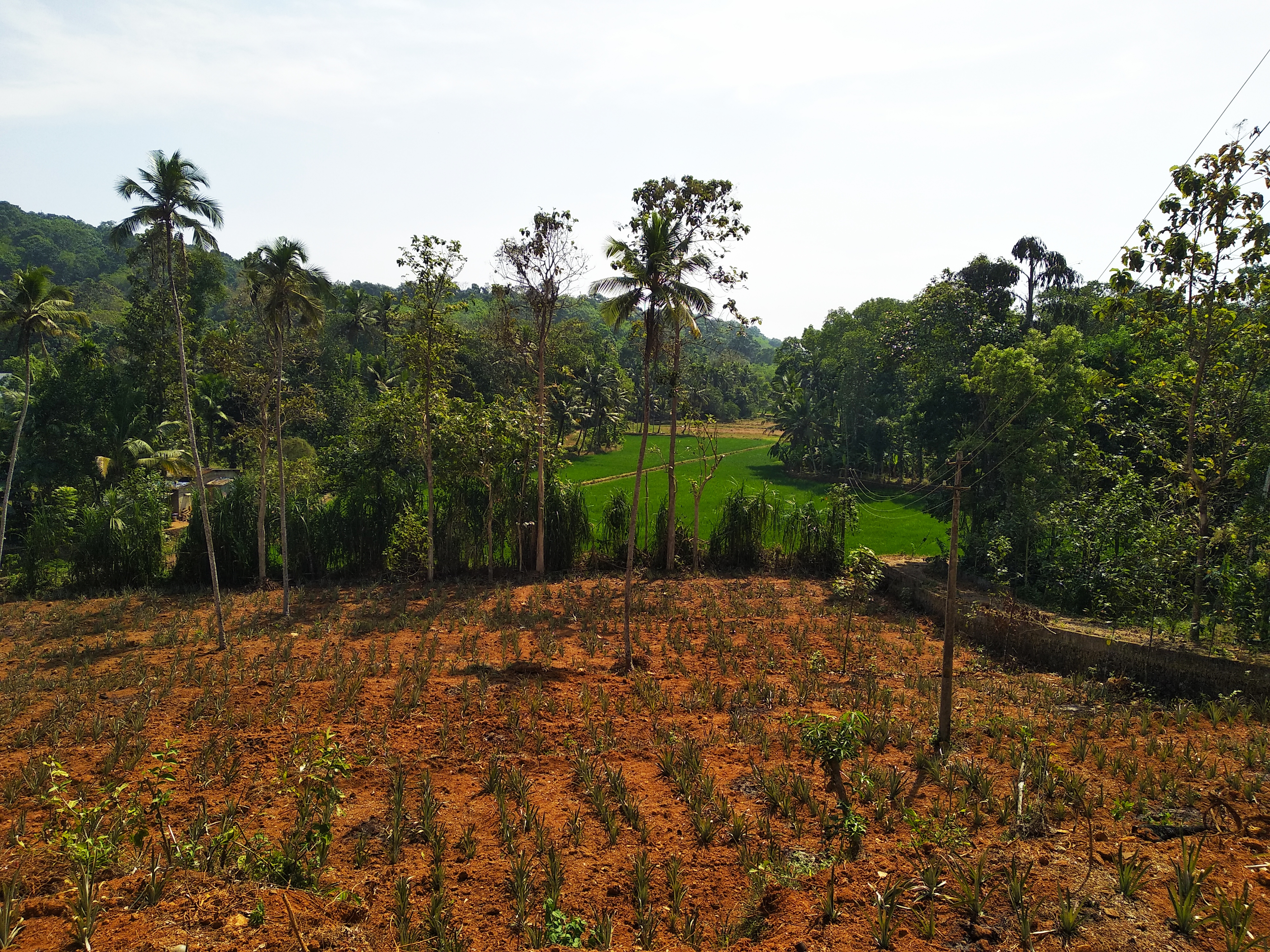
- Mattakkara, Manal
- Interactive map of Mattakkara
- Coordinates: 9.641°N 76.644°E
- Country: India
- State: Kerala
- District: Kottayam

Government
  - Type: Panchayath
  - Body: Ayarakunnam grama panchayath
- Elevation: 3 m (9.8 ft)

Population (2001)
  - Total: 10,725

Languages
  - Official: Malayalam, English
- Time zone: UTC+5:30 (IST)
- PIN: 686564
- Telephone code: 0481
- Vehicle registration: KL-05, KL-35
- Website: www.mattakkara.com

Mattakkara is a part of Kottayam District mainly spread in Akalakunnam Panchayath. This is considered as the biggest kara (land) in Kottayam. The place is accessible by local roads. It is about 20 km (12 mi) from Kottayam and 15 km (9.3 mi) from Palai.Kottayam and 15 km (9.3 mi) from Palai.Historically the region was under domain of ullatt karthas since old travancore rule, .Mattakkara has 90%literacy and major religion in the region are Hinduisam and Christianity.

== Demographics ==
The area is divided by the Pannagam Thodu stream. This has got its name as it flows in a shape of snake (pannagam). The main faiths of Mattakkara are Christianity and Hinduism. People speak Malayalam in their own slang. More than 98% of them are literate.

Most of the people are farmers. The main cultivation is rubber. You can find pepper, paddy, banana, coffee, tapioca and coconut trees like any other place of Kerala in Mattakkara.

== Education ==
The Top Engineering College in Mattakara is TOMS College of Engineering. There is Polytechnic Diploma College under TOMS College.There are many schools like Mattakkara H.S, in the heart of Mattakara, St. Joseph H.S, Manjamattam and Thachilangadu LP School (Government L.P. School) to name a few. There is also a higher secondary school under C.B.S.E syllabus situated at cheppumpara; Cluny Public School and Junior College. The Government of Kerala has put up a Polytechnic here under the aegies of Model Poly Technic Mattakkara - IHRDE to provide technical Education to the rural masses. The Model Polytechnic started functioning in 1995. National Education And Research Foundation established a Photography and Film Institute called Creative Hut Institute of Photography And Film. One of the AMIE coaching Institute and Visveswaraya Institute of Engineering Technology and one engineering college, Toms College of Engineering.

== Flora and fauna ==
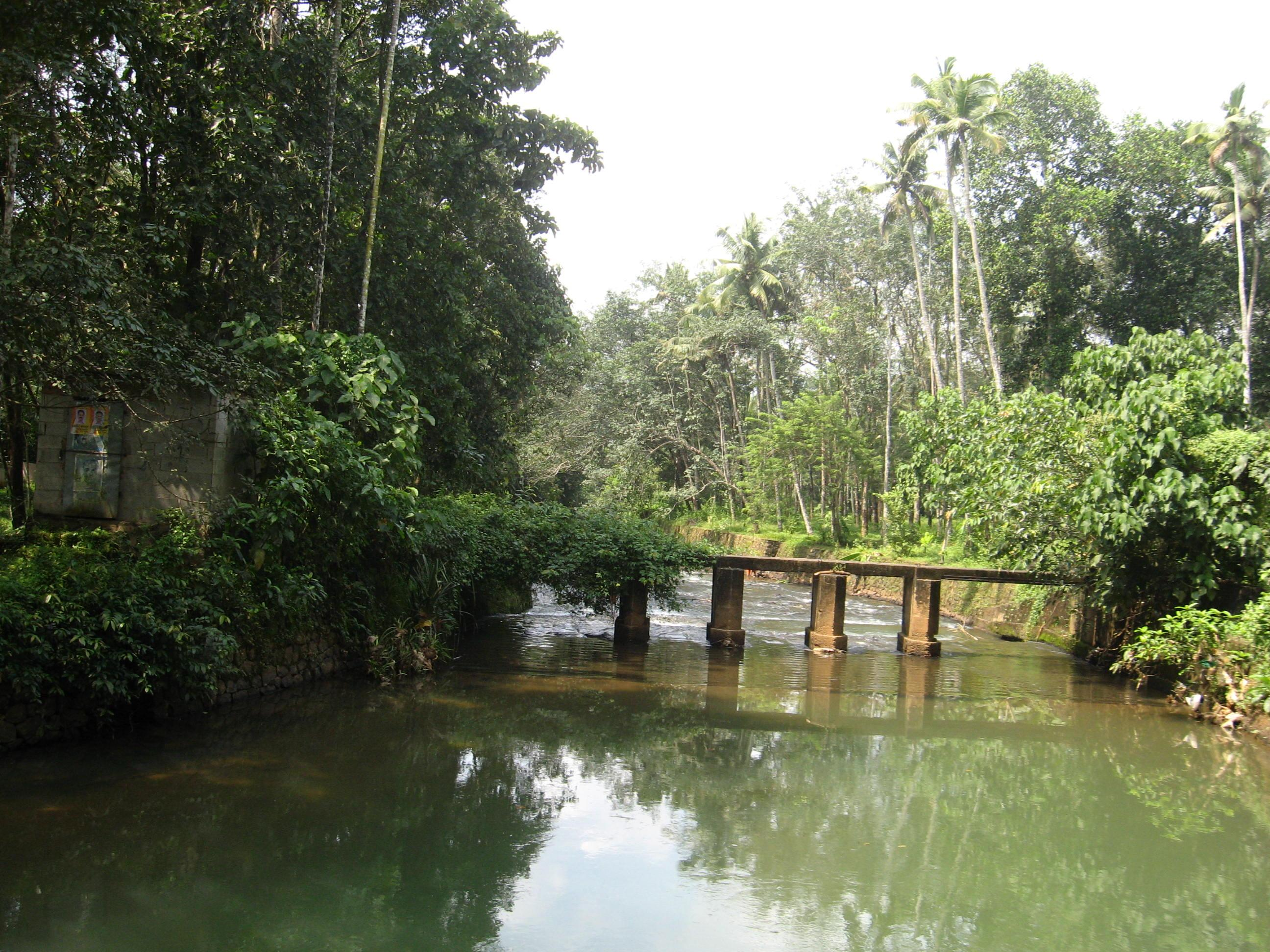
Pannagam Thodu

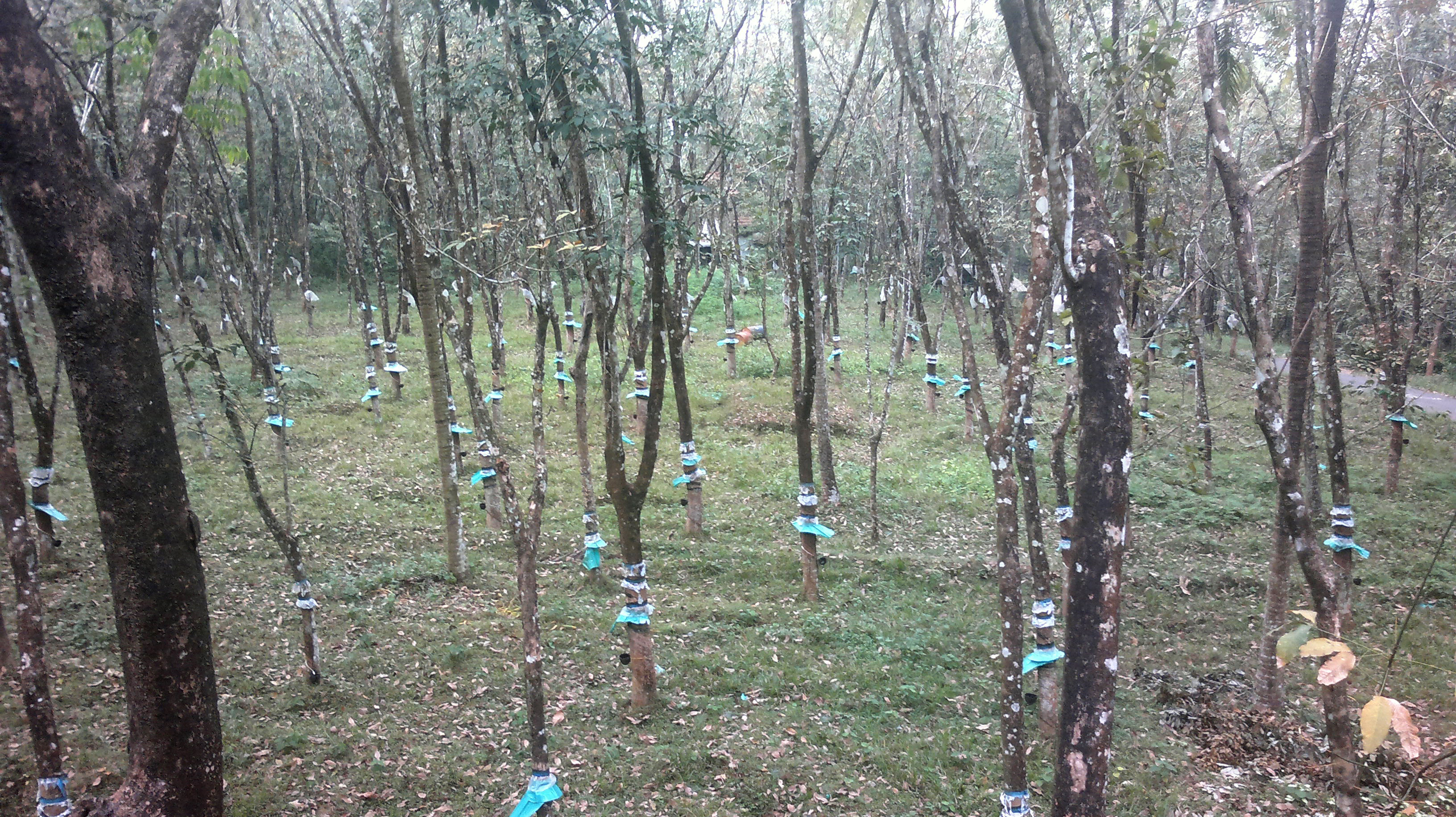
Rubber plantations at Mattakkara

All places consist of wet evergreen plants. Hard working farmers of this place play an important role to make this happen. The main vegetation occurs due to rubber plantations which cover 50% of the area. Coconut trees, cocoa, bamboo and other plants can be found here.

The Pannagam river which flows almost around the year also keeps this vegetation.

== Topiary art garden ==
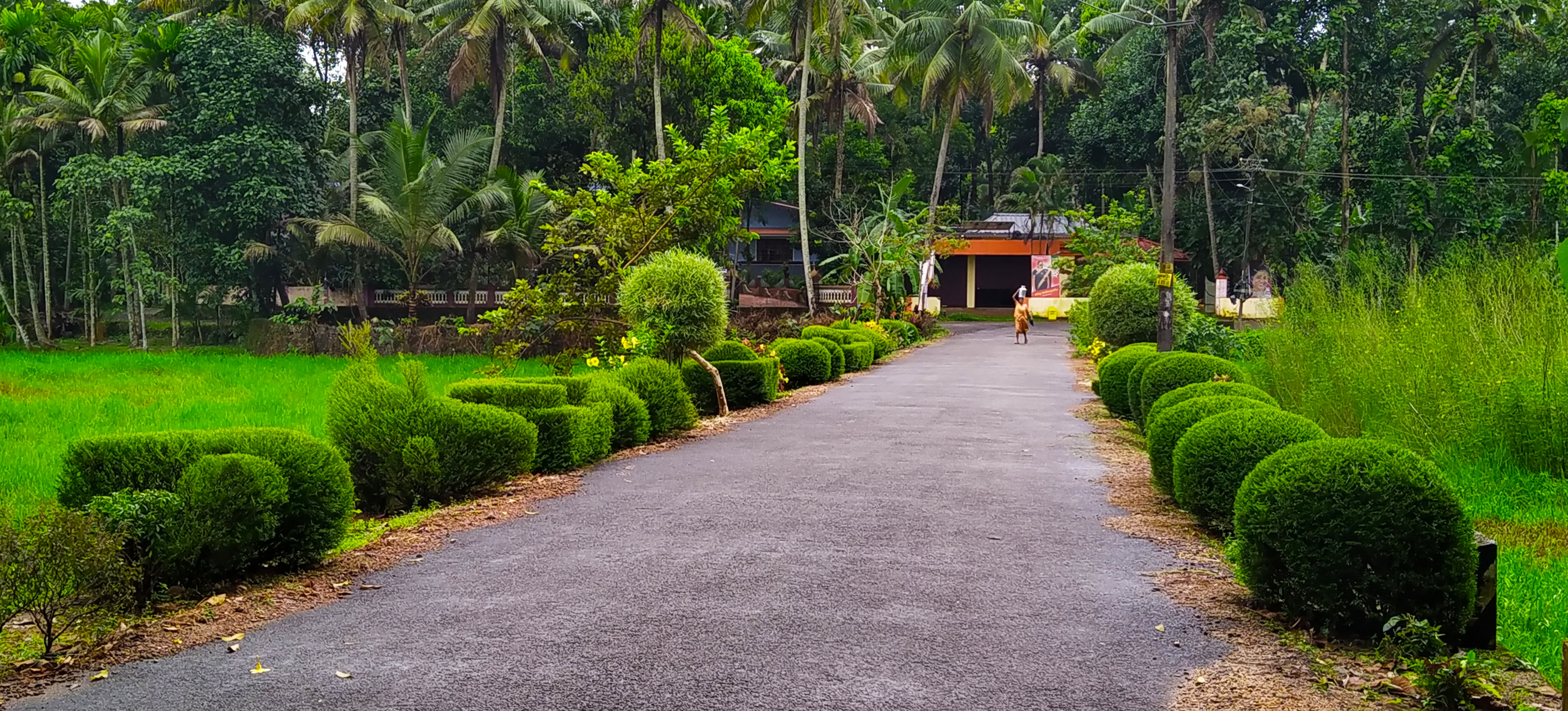
Mattakkara topiary garden

Topiary is the horticultural practice of training perennial plants by clipping the foliage and twigs of trees, shrubs and subshrubs to develop and maintain clearly defined shapes.

== Religion ==
Place of worship in Mattakkara include:

- Holy Family Church Mattakkara
- Sree Bhaghavathi Temple Thuruthipalli Mattakkara
- Aiyroor MahaDeva Temple Pattiyalimattom
- Alphonsagiri Church Nellikunnu
- Blessed Sacrament Church Karimpany
- St. Sebastian's Church Manjamattam
- St. George's Church Mannoor
- Kuttiyanickal dharma shastra temple, Manal, https://www.google.com.pe/maps/place/Kuttiyanikkal+Ayyappa+Temple/@9.6471596,76.6337395,18z/data=!4m5!3m4!1s0x3b07d2af08c1308b:0x78e7fc7ba6e449ac!8m2!3d9.6476051!4d76.6328982
- st.antony's church paduva
- Puthetukavu Devi Temple, https://www.google.com.pe/maps/place/Puthetukavu+Devi+Temple/@9.6404558,76.6472383,17z/data=!4m21!1m15!4m14!1m6!1m2!1s0x3b07cd53bf4fa965:0xb6e36bf558d26b2d!2sPuthetukavu+Devi+Temple!2m2!1d76.649427!2d9.6404558!1m6!1m2!1s0x3b07cd53bf4fa965:0xb6e36bf558d26b2d!2sPuthetukavu+Devi+Temple,+Mattakkara+Kozhuvanal+Rd,+Mattakkara,+Kerala+686564!2m2!1d76.649427!2d9.6404558!3m4!1s0x3b07cd53bf4fa965:0xb6e36bf558d26b2d!8m2!3d9.6404558!4d76.649427
- Kovoor temple, https://www.google.com.pe/maps/place/Kovoor+temple/@9.6432982,76.6475471,17z/data=!3m1!4b1!4m5!3m4!1s0x3b07cd53b5a14c65:0xbde89a3a3dc6c864!8m2!3d9.6432982!4d76.6497358

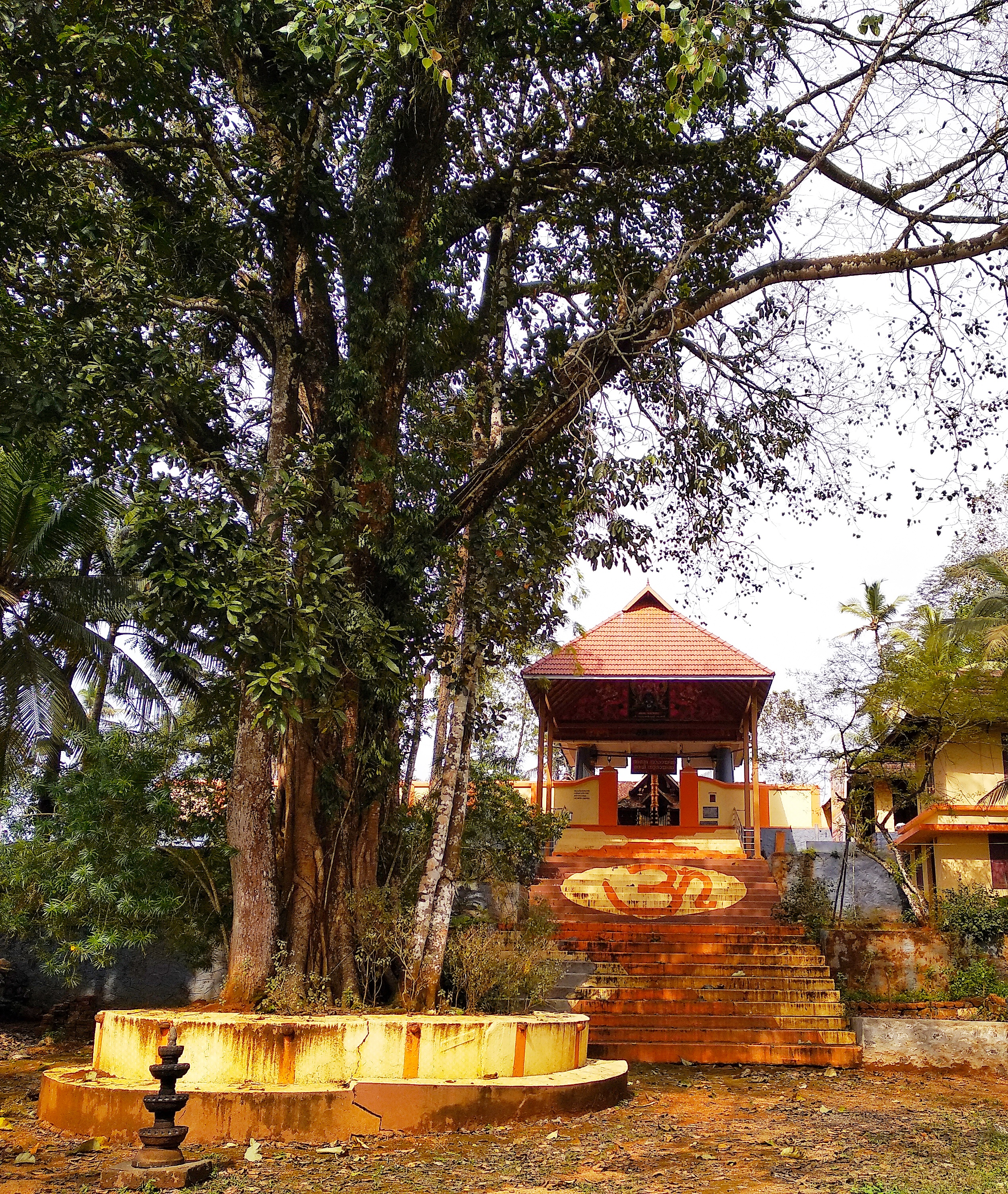
Mattakkara Thuruthippally Bhagavathi Temple

== Subdivisions ==
Mattakkara itself is split into 12 different main smaller areas.

1. Mannoor
2. Manal
3. Vadakkedam
4. Manjamatam
5. Chuvannaplavu
6. Nellikunnu
7. Karimpany
8. Pattyalimattam
9. Cheppumpara
10. Moozhoor
11. Paduva
12. Thachilangadu

== Schools And Colleges ==
1. Mattakkara High School, https://www.google.co.in/maps/place/Mattakkara+High+School/@9.6461017,76.5727648,12z/data=!4m18!1m12!4m11!1m3!2m2!1d76.6434893!2d9.6521941!1m6!1m2!1s0x3b07cd5640901f05:0x5f3c88e7d5938e42!2snss+high+school+mattakkara!2m2!1d76.6428054!2d9.6461088!3m4!1s0x3b07cd5640901f05:0x5f3c88e7d5938e42!8m2!3d9.6461088!4d76.6428054
2. Toms College Of Engineering For Startups
3. Creative Hut Institute Of Photography
4. Thachilangadu LP School, https://www.google.com.pe/maps/place/Thachilangadu+LP+School/@9.6437015,76.6455924,17z/data=!3m1!4b1!4m5!3m4!1s0x3b07cd53ee030319:0xfb7bf3727920a2da!8m2!3d9.6437015!4d76.6477811

Akalakkunnam Govt. L P School, Mattakkara, the first Govt. School in the Panchayath

1. List of all Anganwadis in Mattakkara
  1. Anganwadi Manal (Centre No 17)
  2. Anganwadi Manjamattom (Centre No 2)
  3. Anganwadi Karimpani (Centre No 5)
  4. Anganwadi Thachilangad (Centre No 13)

== Banks ==
- State Bank Of India (State Bank of Travancore), Vadakkedam
- Akalakunnam Service Co-operative Bank
