= Kuriakose Osthathios Thadathil =

Syro-Malankara Catholic bishop

Mar Kuriakose Osthathios
- Titular Bishop of Mariamme and Apostolic Visitor for Europe
- Church: Syro-Malankara Catholic Church
- Appointed: 19 September 2025
- Installed: 6 December 2025
- Predecessor: Yoohanon Mar Theodosius
- Previous post: Pastoral Coordinator for the UK region (2020 - 2025) Master of Ceremonies (2001 - 2020)

Orders
- Ordination: 30 December 1987 by Benedict Gregorios
- Consecration: 22 November 2025 by Baselios Cleemis

Personal details
- Born: 27 March 1962 (age 64) Amayannoor, Kottayam, Kerala, India

Kuriakose Mor Osthathios Thadathil (born 27 March 1962) is an Indian bishop of the Syro-Malankara Catholic Church. He serves as the Apostolic Visitor for the Syro-Malankara Catholic faithful in Europe and holds the titular see of Mariamme.

== Early life and education ==
Born in Amayannoor, Kottayam district, Thadathil completed his schooling locally before earning a Bachelor of Arts in English Literature from the University of Calicut. He underwent priestly training at St. Joseph's Pontifical Seminary, Aluva, and was ordained a priest on 30 December 1987 for the Archeparchy of Tiruvalla.

He later obtained a Doctorate in Liturgy from the Pontifical Oriental Institute in Rome.

== Ministry ==
Following his ordination, Thadathil served as a parish priest in various locations within the Archeparchy of Tiruvalla. Between 2001 and 2020, he served as the Master of Ceremonies for the Syro-Malankara Church and was the Chancellor of the Archeparchy from 2013 to 2017. In 2020, he was appointed as the Pastoral Coordinator for the Syro-Malankara community in the United Kingdom.

=== Episcopate ===
On 19 September 2025, Thadathil was elected by the Synod of the Syro-Malankara Church as the Apostolic Visitor for Europe. He was consecrated a bishop on 22 November 2025 at St. Mary's Cathedral, Thiruvananthapuram. Moran Mor Baselios Cleemis served as the principal consecrator, assisted by Archbishop Thomas Mar Koorilos and Bishop Joseph Mar Thomas.

He was formally installed as the Apostolic Visitor in Leicester, England, on 6 December 2025. His role involves the administrative and spiritual coordination of the church's faithful across the European continent.
