= St. Thomas School, Thiruvananthapuram =

St.Thomas Schools
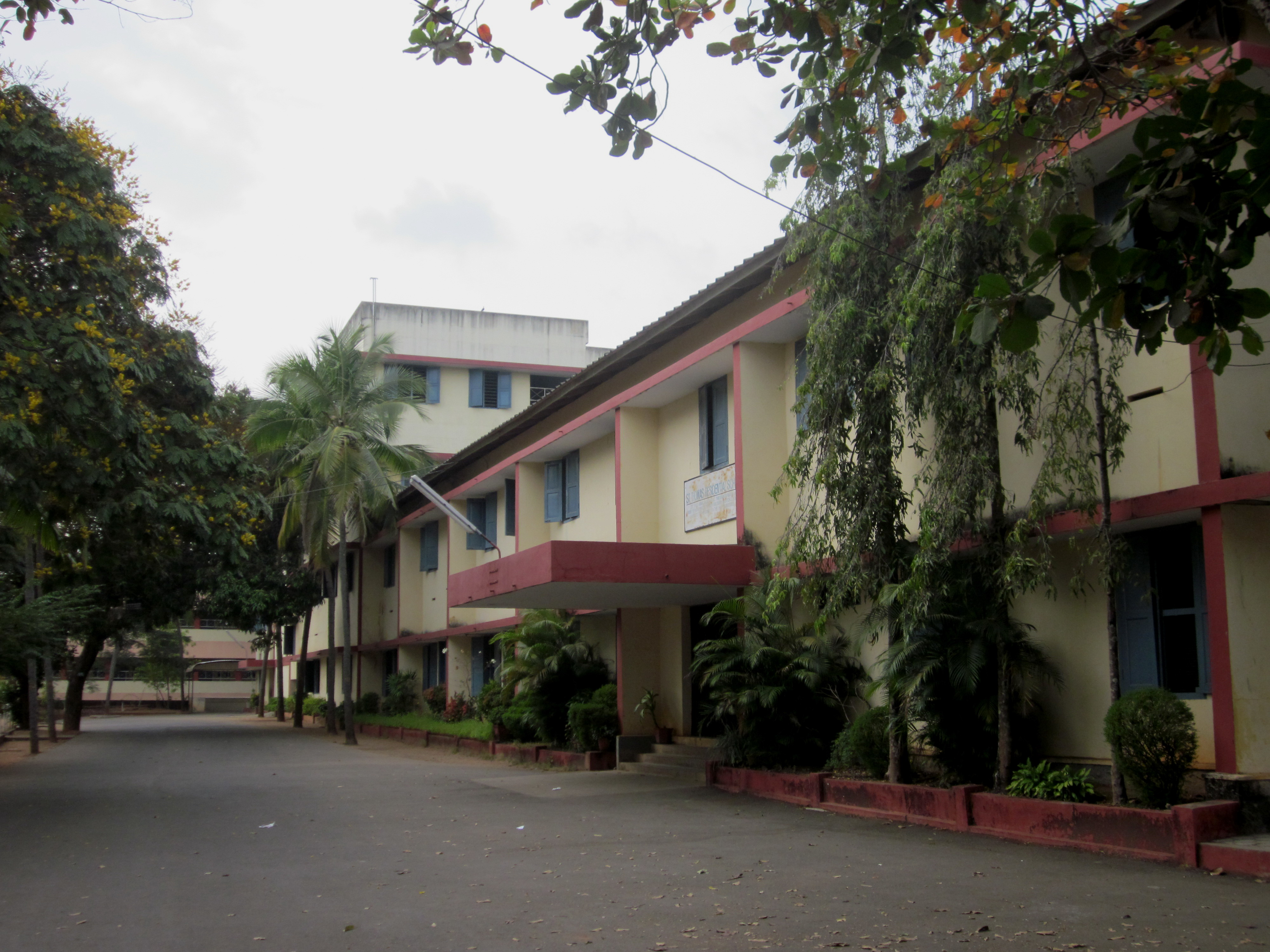
- St. Thomas Residential School, Trivandrum

Location
- Thiruvananthapuram, Kerala; India; 8.5615°N 76.9535°E

Information
- Type: Boarding school/High school
- Motto: Thamaso ma Jyothir Gamaya (From darkness take me to light)
- Established: 6 June 1966
- Locale: Mukkolakkal
- Staff: 80+
- Faculty: 350+
- Grades: Kindergarten to XII
- Enrollment: 6000+
- Sports: Football (soccer), Hockey, Basketball, Cricket, Tennis, Roller skating, Athletics
- Publication: The Threshold, Vignettes
- Yearbook: Bhavana Avana
- Website: www.stthomastvm.edu.in

St. Thomas Schools is a privately owned English medium coeducational boarding high school at Thiruvananthapuram in the south Indian state of Kerala.

The school was established by the Mar Thoma Church Educational Society (MTCES) on 6 June 1966. It is located on a 30-acre (120,000 m^{2}) campus at Mukkolakkal, a village on the outskirts of Thiruvananthapuram city. There are distinct institutions within the campus: St. Thomas Central School, St. Thomas Higher Secondary School, St. Thomas Teachers' Training College, St. Thomas Residential School and St. Thomas Pre-primary School. The students of the St Thomas are popularly called Santhomites.

The campus has three schools inside which offers three different syllabi of examination: Kerala State Board, Central Board of Secondary Education (CBSE), and Indian Certificate of Secondary Education/Indian School Certificate (ICSE/ISC)

The school has a vast school bus system which spans over the entire city with more than 45 bus routes.

== History ==
The school was established by the Mar Thoma Church Educational Society (MTCES) of the Malankara Marthoma Syrian Church on 6 June 1966. The Society also runs an Engineering College (St.Thomas Institute for Science and Technology) and a CBSE School (St.Thomas Public School) at its Kazhakkoottam campus and a Preschool (STPrS) at Kumarapuram. The first principal of the school was Rev. P.K. Koshy, who served as Principal from 1966 to 1968. The principals since then were

- Mr. T.Paul Varghese (1968–72)
- Mr. P.T.Mathew (1972–73)
- Mr. Thomas Mathai (1973–81)
- Mr. Thomas.P.Athyal (1981–88)
- Dr. V.M.John (1988–98)
- Mr. M.M.Mathew (1998-03)
- Mrs. Achamma Zachariah (2003–09)
- Mr. Rajan K Varughese (2009–18)
- Mr. Babykutty P Rajan (2018– )

== Campus ==
Located on the outskirts of Thiruvananthapuram city at Mukkolakkal, St. Thomas Schools has a 32-acre campus. The school has a synthetic Turf Tennis court, a hockey field, a football ground with a 400m running track, a basketball court cum skating rink, a swimming pool, boarding hostels and a canteen.

The residential school includes a state-of-the-art Computer facility and Science labs for the students. STCS and STRS have Atal Tinkering Labs funded by the Atal Innovation Mission under Niti Aayog.

== Colosseum ==
In 2009, St. Thomas Central School started the inter school fete, Colosseum. This is also organized by 12th grade students with help from the teachers and juniors. The motto for Colosseum 2k13 was "One Team. One Dream."

== Controversy ==
In 2017, two students of opposite sex were expelled from St Thomas Central school on charge of hugging each other in school premises. Additionally, private Instagram accounts of the students were accessed to provide additional 'evidence' against students. These personal pictures of the two teenagers were described by the school as "indecent, scandalous, highly objectionable lascivious material which appeals to prurient interest." Student's parents approached the Childs Rights Commission and Kerala High Court to move against school's action. The Kerala High Court deemed the action of the school management to be legal and rejected an interim order from the Child Rights Commission that suggested the students be allowed to attend classes. The school's stand was that students of opposite sex are not allowed to hug or shake each other's hands to congratulate each other and any such behavior is an act of indiscipline.

== Notable alumni ==
- Arun Kumar Aravind, Indian film director, editor and producer
- Jassie Gift, Indian film music composer and playback singer
- Chandy Oommen, MLA Puthuppally
