= Mathrumala =

Hill located in Kerala, India

Mathrumala is a hill located 16 km (9.9 mi) east of the town of Kottayam in Kooroppada, Kottayam District, Kerala, India. The hilltop has a temple shrine dedicated to Rajarajeshwari (Devi).

== History ==
The Thekkumkur kings, based at Vennimala, had their army posts in the area near Mathrumala and the entire area was governed by Ambazhathunkal Karthas. In AD 1749 King Marthanda Varma captured Thekkumkur and annexed it to Venad. Previous lords namely Ambazhathunkal Karthas were removed from their posts and a large portion of the land then came under the tenancy of the Kolathettu family who had migrated to Kooroppada from Kolathunadu in Malabar. The area including Mathrumala was inhabited by farm laborers of the Paraya community who worked in the land owned by the Kolathettu family. These farm labourers had their Kuladevata (deity), called Saptamathrukkal, installed on hilltop and regular offerings were made.

In the early 1950s, Mathrumala was inherited by the progeny of Kolathettu family namely Chempakasseril Thankamma, Tharavattathil Pappiyamma, Champakara Savithriyamma and Asariparambil Gopala Pillai. In the mid-1960s, Assariparambil Gopala Pillai had sold some land near to hilltop to Padoor Sreedharan Pillai. This portion of land was again sold to Scaria Kalayil. With his help, Kooroppada Holy Cross Church erected an iron cross on hilltop though the land was not officially owned by them.This caused tension between local Christians and Hindus. In 1967, Mulanthanathu G. Raman Nair and his sisters who inherited the property filed a case in Kottayam Munsiff Court. The case continued for nearly 15 years. The Church authorities were ordered to hand over the land for reconstruction of the original temple. Subsequently the sisters who owned the land donated their share to the temple for its further expansion. The cross was also subsequently removed. The temple is now managed by the Kerala Kshetra Samrakshana Samiti.
