= Chandy Oommen =

Indian lawyer and politician

Member of the Kerala Legislative Assembly
- Incumbent
- Assumed office 11 September 2023
- Preceded by: Oommen Chandy
- Constituency: Puthuppally

Coordinator of the National Talent Hunt Programme for Meghalaya and Arunachal Pradesh
- Incumbent
- Assumed office 22 October 2025
- Preceded by: Position established

Chairman of the National Outreach Cell, Indian Youth Congress
- In office 13 June 2022 – 19 July 2024
- Preceded by: Shesh Narayan Ojha

Secretary (Kerala) of the Indian Youth Congress
- In office 13 June 2011 – 21 March 2016
- Preceded by: S. T. Aneesh
- Succeeded by: Abid Shahim

Personal details
- Born: 1 March 1986 (age 40) Puthuppally, Kerala, India
- Party: Indian National Congress
- Parents: Oommen Chandy (father); Mariamma Oommen (mother)
- Education: Mar Ivanios College; St. Stephen's College, Delhi; Delhi University; National Law University, Delhi; London School of Economics; Christ University, Bangalore
- Occupation: Lawyer; lecturer; politician

Chandy Oommen (born 1 March 1986) is an Indian lawyer, lecturer, and politician. He is an advocate by profession, who practices law at the Supreme Court of India since 2016. He currently serves as the Member of the Kerala Legislative Assembly representing Puthuppally Assembly constituency, since 2023, and was the Chairman of the National Outreach Cell of the Indian Youth Congress. In September 2024, Government of India appointed Oommen as the Empanelled Advocate to represent the National Highways Authority of India in Courts in Kerala.

The son of veteran Congress leader and former Chief Minister of Kerala, Oommen Chandy, Chandy is a member of the Indian National Congress (INC) and the Kerala Pradesh Congress Committee (KPCC). His entry into electoral politics occurred in September 2023 when he contested in the Puthupally assembly byelection and won with an unprecedented margin of 37,719 votes, setting a new record for the constituency.

== Early life and education ==
Chandy Oommen was born on 1 March 1986 in Puthuppally, Kottayam district of Kerala, India as the only son of former chief minister Oommen Chandy and Mariamma Oommen. He was named after his paternal grandfather, K. O. Chandy. Chandy has two sisters—Maria and Achu Oommen.

Chandy completed his schooling at St. Thomas Residential School, Thiruvananthapuram and Loyola School, Thiruvananthapuram. He went to college at Mar Ivanios College, Thiruvananthapuram, for a bachelor's degree in economics. He then pursued his bachelor's (BA Hons) and master's MA degrees in history at St. Stephen's College, Delhi, where he was the president of the college students' union from 2006 to 2007. After completing his post-graduation, he went on to earn an LLB from Delhi University and an LLM in criminology from the National Law University, Delhi. Additionally, he completed a summer course at the London School of Economics. Subsequently, he obtained an additional LLM in constitutional law from Christ University, Bengaluru in 2016.

== Career ==
=== Profession and political beginnings ===
He functioned as a member of the Organising Committee of the 2010 Commonwealth Games. Chandy, who is an advocate by profession, has been practicing law at the Supreme Court of India since 2016. In between, he also worked as an adjunct lecturer at the Amity University, Noida and the Vivekananda Institute of Professional Studies, Delhi from 2017 to 2020.

Chandy was active in politics since his college days. He is a member of the Indian National Congress (INC) and the Kerala Pradesh Congress Committee (KPCC). He previously served as the Secretary of the Indian Youth Congress in the state of Kerala. He later assumed the role of chairman of the National Outreach Cell of the Indian Youth Congress in 2022. In late 2022, Chandy embarked on a 4,000 kilometer barefoot walk as part of the Bharat Jodo Yatra movement led by INC leader Rahul Gandhi. However, he had to step down before its completion due to his father's illness.

=== Electoral politics ===
His father Oommen Chandy, the former Chief Minister of Kerala represented the Puthuppally Assembly constituency consecutively for 53 years. Puthuppally by-election was necessitated by the death of his father in July 2023. Chandy was selected as the candidate of United Democratic Front (UDF) by the Kerala Pradesh Congress Committee (KPCC), who submitted his nomination for the bypoll. Election was held on 5 September. His election campaign began on 23 August. The result was announced on 8 September. Chandy won the bypoll with a record margin of 37,719 votes against Jaick C. Thomas of the Left Democratic Front (LDF) by amassing 80,144 votes altogether. It was the highest ever margin for any candidate in the history of Puthuppally assembly election. The vote share of UDF also raised to 13.3 percent compared to last assembly election.

He contested from Puthuppally Assembly constituency in the 2026 Kerala Legislative Assembly election and won by a margin of 52,907 votes against K. M. Radhakrishnan of the Communist Party of India (Marxist) (CPIM). His election campaign had received widespread attention as he campaigned for the election on a bicycle and avoided flex boards and posters.

== Election records ==
Kerala Assembly by-election, 2023 : Puthuppally
Party	Candidate	Votes	%	±%
INC	Chandy Oommen	80,144	61.38%	▲13.3
CPI(M)	Jaick C. Thomas	42,425	32.49%	▼8.73
BJP	G. Lijinlal	6,558	5.02%	▼3.82
AAP	Luke Thomas	835	0.64%	
Independent	Santhosh Pulickal	78	0.06%	
Independent	Shaji	63	0.05%	
Independent	P.K Devadas	60	0.05%	
NOTA	None of the above	400	0.31%	▼0.07
Margin of victory		37,719	29.32%	▲22.46
Turnout		1,28,624	72.1%	▼5.26
INC hold		Swing	▲13.3	

2026 Kerala Assembly election : Puthuppally
Party	Candidate	Votes	%	±%
INC	Chandy Oommen	84,031	64.12%	▲2.74
CPI(M)	K. M. Radhakrishnan	31,124	23.75%	▼8.74
BJP	Raveendranath Vakathanam	11,544	8.81%	▲3.79
BSP	Paul P Chacko	663	0.51%	
Janam Rashtriya Party	Sabu Mylakkadan	122	0.09%	
Independent	Rijomon Mathew	83	0.06%	
NOTA	None of the above	613	0.47%	▲0.16
Margin of victory		52,907	40.37%	▲11.05
Turnout		1,31,041	73.22%	▲1.12
INC hold		Swing	▲5.74	
