= Amayannoor =

Amayannoor Abhimanyupuram
- village
- Location in India, Kerala Amayannoor (India)
- Coordinates: 9°39′49.43″N 76°35′40.41″E
- Country: India
- State: Kerala
- District: Kottayam

Government
  - Type: Panchayath
  - Body: Ayarkunnam panchayath

Languages
  - Official: Malayalam, English
- Time zone: UTC+5:30 (IST)
- PIN: 686019
- Area code: 0481
- Vehicle registration: KL-05
- Nearest cities: Ayarkunnam, Kidangoor
- Nearest airport: Cochin International Airport Limited

Amayannoor is a village in Kottayam district in the Indian state of Kerala. Administratively, it falls under Ayarkkunnam panchayath. It is located about 1.7 km from Ayarkkunnam, 4.6 km from Manarcaud and 8.1 km from Kidangoor.

Amayannoor is home to several prominent churches such as Kazhunnuvalam St. Thomas Orthodox Church, Karattukunnel St. Mary's Orthodox Church, Vadakkanmannoor St. Thomas Orthodox Church, St. Gregorios Orthodox Chapel under the Diocese of Kottayam of the Malankara Orthodox Church.

Nearby to Amayannoor is the famous Thoothootty Mor Gregorian Retreat Centre under the Jacobite Syrian Church and Thoothootty St. Gregorios Orthodox Chapel (Under Amayannoor St. Mary's Orthodox Church).

== Etymology ==
Etymologically, the name Amayannoor derived from 'Abhimanyupuram' which literally means the land of Abhimanyu, son of Arjuna.

== Legend ==
According to the legends, Pandavas came here during their twelve years of exile and Abhimanyu consecrated a Shivalinga idol there. After a long time, a Pulaya woman who came to collect wood found a Lingam. Thekkumkur raja acknowledged by this construed a shrine for Lord Shiva there.

One day, the queen came to visit the temple. She was deeply amused by the shining 'Manikya' (Ruby gemstone) in the Linga idol. She made a request to the Ooranmas (temple administrators) to own the precious stone. But upon the denial, rani with her royal powers ordered the soldiers to take the stone. They killed the chief priest and took it from the Sreekovil. From there onwards, her dynasty was haunted by certain catastrophic and unfortunate events and even led to the destruction of the village. On Malayalam month Dhanu 23, 1068 CE, the temple faced a conflagration. In 1109 CE, the temple and its complete assets were given to a person named 'Thiruvarppu Madappuram Swamiyar'. At present, the temple have daily poojas and annual festivities.

== Main landmarks ==
- Sri Mahadeva temple
- Amayannoor High School

== Geography ==
Thiruvanchoor, Ayarkunnam and Neericadu are the nearest villages of Amayannoor.
