= Arumanoor =

- village
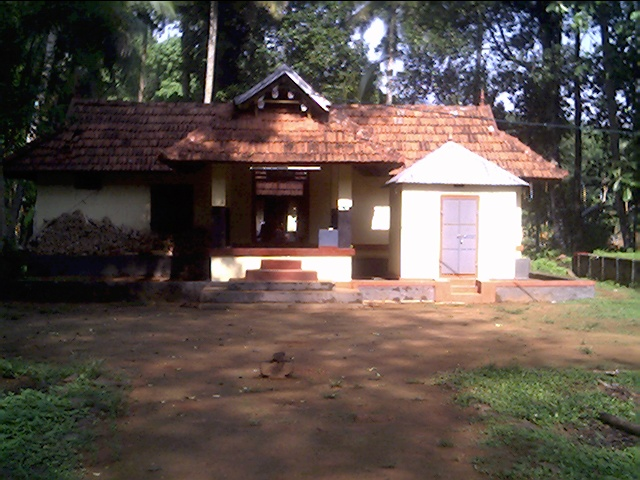
- Temple, Arumanoor, 2007
- Interactive map of Arumanoor
- Coordinates: 8.338726°N 77.075186°E
- Country: India
- State: Kerala
- District: Kottayam

Population
  - Total: 2,000

Languages
  - Official: Malayalam, English
- Time zone: UTC+5:30 (IST)
- PIN: 686568
- Telephone code: 0481
- Vehicle registration: KL-05
- Nearest city: Ettumanoor
- Sex ratio: 1:1 ♂/♀
- Literacy: 100%
- Lok Sabha constituency: Kottayam

Arumanoor is a village on the banks of the river Meenachil in Kottayam district, Kerala, India. It is between the towns of Ettumanoor and Ayarkunnam, and has a population of 2,000.
