= Kodoor River =

River in Kerala, India

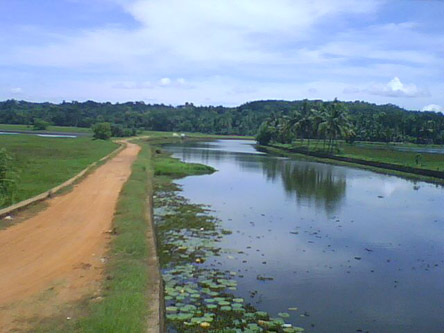

Kodoor River is a river between Kottayam and Alappuzha districts, Kerala, India.

Kodoor River has a long history with the old trading routes between the coastal district Alapuzha and the eastern villages of Kottayam. There was a busy jetty at Puthuppally named Angadi, which means market. The river is originated from the beautiful hills in between Kottayam and Pathanamthitta districts and finally empties into the Meenachil River.

== Water Hyacinth ==
In July 2016, the cleaning of the Kodoor river was taken up to clear the water Hyacinth and make the way for Kottayam-Alappuzha boat service from Kodimatha boat jetty. In May 2019, once again the water Hyacinth was removed to restore the 3.5km waterway from Kanjiram to Kodimatha. Kerala also found a novel way to get rid of Hyacinth.
