= Kooroppada =

- village
- Location in Kerala, India Kooroppada (India)
- Coordinates: 9°36′0″N 76°40′0″E
- Country: India
- State: Kerala
- District: Kottayam

Government
  - Body: Gramapanchayat

Area
  - Total: 27.42 km^{2} (10.59 sq mi)

Population (2011)
  - Total: 25,999
  - Density: 818/km^{2} (2,120/sq mi)

Languages
  - Official: Malayalam, English
- Time zone: UTC+5:30 (IST)
- PIN: 686502
- Vehicle registration: KL-05
- Nearest city: Kottayam, Pampady.
- Sex ratio: 998 ♂/♀
- Literacy: 97%%
- Lok Sabha constituency: Kottayam
- Vidhan Sabha constituency: Puthuppally
- Civic agency: Gramapanchayat
- Website: lsgkerala.in/kooroppadapanchayat/about/

Kooroppada is a village in Kottayam district, Kerala, India, situated 16 kilometres east to Kottayam town. Kooroppada village was formed in 1953 by merging Kooroppada with a certain portion of Pampady and Anikkad villages.

== History ==
As per the known history, Kooroppada was the place where Thekkumkur Kings with their headquarters at Vennimala accommodated their royal army. In Malayalam, the word ‘koor’ means loyalty and 'pada' means army. So the land of loyal army has become Kooroppada. In AD 1749 King Marthanda Varma captured Thekkumkur and annexed it to Venad. Previous land lords namely Ambazhathunkal Karthas were removed from their posts and a large portion of the land then came under the tenancy of Kolathettu family who were migrated to Kooroppada from Kolathunadu due to Islamic conquest.

== Economy ==
Kooroppada has a predominantly agricultural economy. The major products include: rubber, banana, cocoa and pineapple.

== Schools ==
Government Vocational Higher Secondary School, Kothala, Government L.P School Lakkattoor, Santa Maria Public School & Junior College, Kooroppada, Sacred Heart High School, Pangada, MGM NSS Higher Secondary School, Lakkattoor and NSS Higher Secondary School, Kothala

== Places of worship ==
Major churches in Kooroppada

Mar Sleeva Syro Malabar Church (Kooroppada pally) and Sacred Heart Church, Pangada, Marthamariyam Syro Malabar Church Chepumpara Lakkootoor

major temples in the heart of Kooroppada village. They are Shree Dharmasastha temple, Mathrumala Devi temple and Anthimahakalan temple. Other temples in the village are Madappadu Bhagawati temple, Pangada Moothedath Bhagawati temple, Lakkattoor Shiva Parvathi temple, Kothala Ilankavu Bhagawati temple and SN Puram Surya temple.

Prominent churches of this village are St Johns SYRIAN ORTHODOX CHURCH, Edakattukunnu (Edakattukunnupally ) .

== Nearby places ==
It is well connected to Pampady, Kottayam, Ponkunnam, Kanjirappally, Pallickathode, Puthuppally and Karukachal

As of 2001 India census, Kooroppada had a population of 24480 with 12142 males and 12338 females.
