= Vettam Mani =

Indian scholar and writer

- Born: 27 August 1921; Puthuppally, Kottayam, Kerala, India
- Died: 29 May 1987 (aged 65)
- Occupations: Scholar, Writer, Teacher
- Spouse: Annamma Mani
- Writing career
- Genres: Encyclopedia, Purana

Vettam Mani or Vettom Mani (27 August 1921 – 29 May 1987) was an eminent Indian scholar and writer. His most famous work is the Purāņic Encyclopedia, which is a monumental and exhaustive study of the Indian Puranas, epics and the allied literature of Hinduism. It constituted the results of the author's devoted study and research extending over fourteen years.

== Publications ==
1. Purāņic Encyclopedia, Published by DC Books. The English Translation is published by Motilal Banarsidass, ISBN 978-0-89581-172-1.
2. English Gurunathan, Published by DC Books.
3. Hindi Gurunathan, Published by DeAr Books. Contents Hindi Grammar, spoken Hindi, Hindi Malayalam Dictionary
4. Selected Malayalam Poems of 2000 Years
