= Meenadam =

Meenadom
- village
- Location in Kerala, India Meenadom (India)
- Coordinates: 9°33′0″N 76°36′0″E
- Country: India
- State: Kerala
- District: Kottayam
- Formed: 3 November 1982

Government
  - Type: Local Self Government
  - Body: Gram panchayat

Area
  - Total: 11.44 km^{2} (4.42 sq mi)

Population (2011)
  - Total: 12,904
  - Density: 1,128/km^{2} (2,921/sq mi)

Languages
  - Official: Malayalam, English
- Time zone: UTC+5:30 (IST)
- PIN: 686516
- Telephone code: 0481-255
- Vehicle registration: KL-5

Meenadom is a village in Kottayam, Kerala, India.

As of 2011 India census, Meenadom had a population of 12904 with 6363 males and 6541 females.
