= Akalakunnam =

- village
- Location in Kerala, India Akalakunnam (India)
- Coordinates: 9.6326500°N 76.6675700°E
- Country: India
- State: Kerala
- District: Kottayam

Government
  - Type: Panchayati raj (India)
  - Body: Gram panchayat

Area
  - Total: 34.84 km^{2} (13.45 sq mi)

Population (2011)
  - Total: 15,082
  - Density: 432.9/km^{2} (1,121/sq mi)

Languages
  - Official: Malayalam, English
- Time zone: UTC+5:30 (IST)
- PIN: 686579
- Vehicle registration: KL-05
- Literacy: 96%

Akalakunnam is a village in Kottayam district in the state of Kerala, India.

== Demographics ==
As of 2011 India census, Akalakunnam had a population of 15,082 with 7,379 males and 7,703 females.
