= Ayarkunnam =

- village
- Location in Kerala, India Ayarkunnam (India)
- Coordinates: 9°38′09″N 76°36′21.1″E
- Country: India
- State: Kerala
- District: Kottayam

Languages
  - Official: Malayalam, English
- Time zone: UTC+5:30 (IST)
- PIN: 686564
- Vehicle registration: KL-05 (Kottayam)
- Nearest city: Kottayam, Ettumanoor, Pala

Ayarkunnam is a town located between the cities of Pala and Kottayam. It is administered by the Ayarkunnam Grama Panchayat and there are 20 grama panchayat wards in Ayarkunnam.

According to Census 2011 information the location code or village code of Ayarkunnam village is 628159. Ayarkunnam village is located in Kottayam Tehsil of Kottayam district in Kerala, India. It is situated 15 km away from Kottayam, which is both district and sub-district headquarter of Ayarkunnam village. As per 2009 stats, Ayarkunnam is the gram panchayat of Ayarkunnam village.

The total geographical area of village is 2513 hectares. Ayarkunnam has a total population of 28,718 peoples. There are about 7,063 houses in Ayarkunnam village. Ettumanoor is the nearest municipality to Ayarkunnam.Kottayam and Pala are about 15 km from Ayarkunnam.
