= Puthuppally, Kottayam =

Town in Kerala, India

Puthuppally
- Census Town
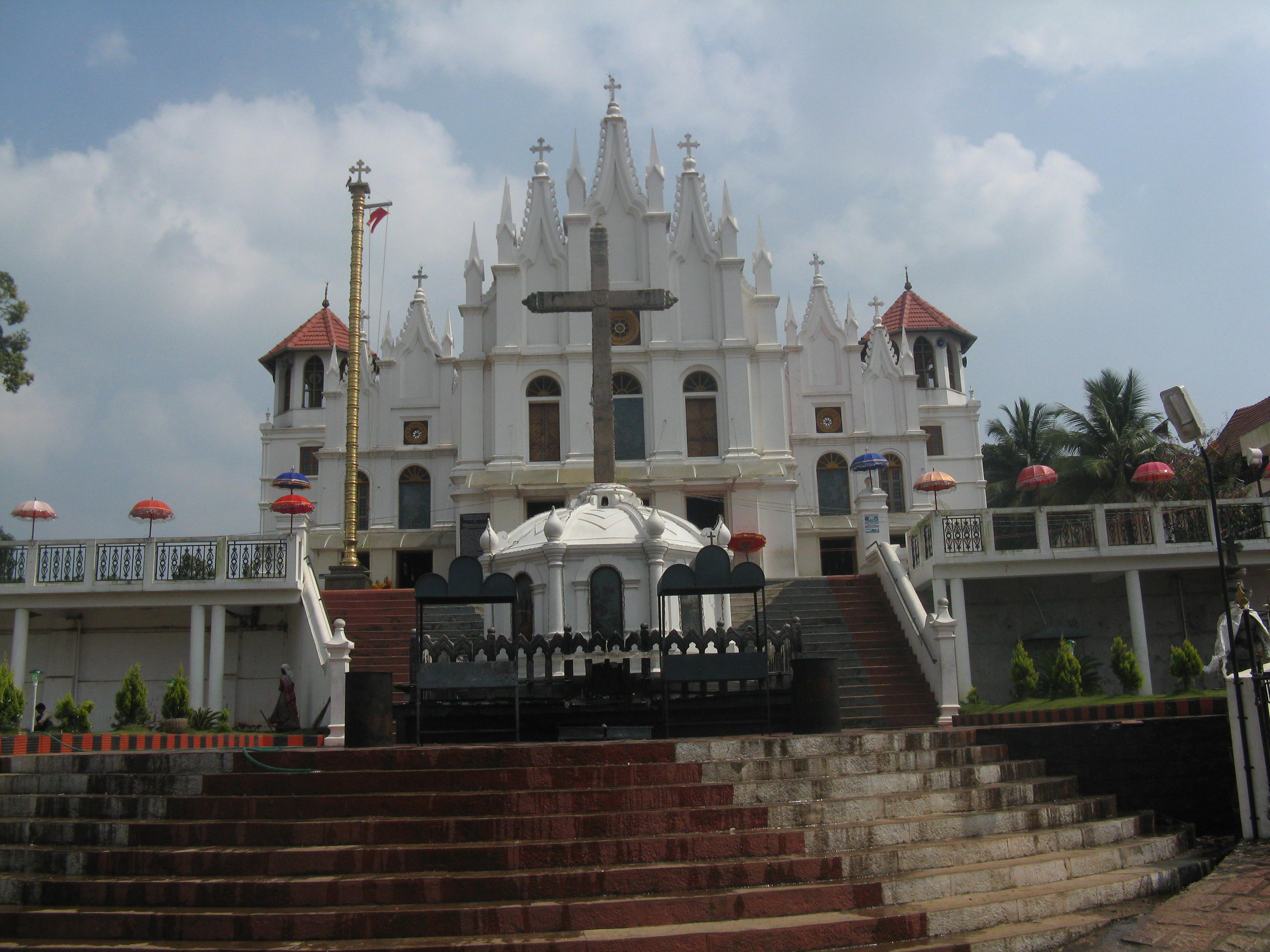

- Location in Kerala, India
- Coordinates: 9°33′33.96″N 76°34′19.98″E
- Country: India
- State: Kerala
- District: Kottayam

Government
  - Body: Puthuppally Grama Panchayat

Area
  - Total: 22.43 km^{2} (8.66 sq mi)

Population (2011)
  - Total: 29,635
  - Density: 1,321/km^{2} (3,422/sq mi)

Languages
  - Official: Malayalam, English
- Time zone: UTC+5:30 (IST)
- PIN: 686011
- Telephone code: +91 481-XXXXXXX
- Vehicle registration: KL- 05
- Nearest city: Kottayam
- Lok Sabha constituency: Kottayam
- Climate: http://kottayam.nic.in/profile/climate.htm (Köppen)
- Website: kottayam.nic.in

Puthuppally is a town in the Kottayam district of Kerala, India. The community is known for its ancient Malankara Orthodox Syrian Church, Puthuppally Palli.

The town hosts the campus of Rubber Board, the biggest central government organization in the district. The town is also home to the Institute of Human Resources Development campus as well as MG University paramedical campuses. Puthuppally is the hometown of former Chief Minister of Kerala Oommen Chandy.

== Demographics ==
As of the 2011 Census, Puthuppally has a population of 29,635 of which 14,304 are males and 15,331 are females. Average sex ratio is 1072 compared to the state average of 1084. The number of children under the age of 6 is 2,291 which accounts for 7.73% of total population of the town. Child sex ratio is around 914 compared to state average of 964. Literacy rate of Puthuppally city is 98.02% which is higher than state average of 94.00%.

== Governance ==
Puthuppally assembly constituency is part of Kottayam (Lok Sabha constituency). The former Chief Minister of Kerala Oommen Chandy, was representing the Puthuppally Legislative Constituency since 1970 till his death in 2023.

== Notable sites ==
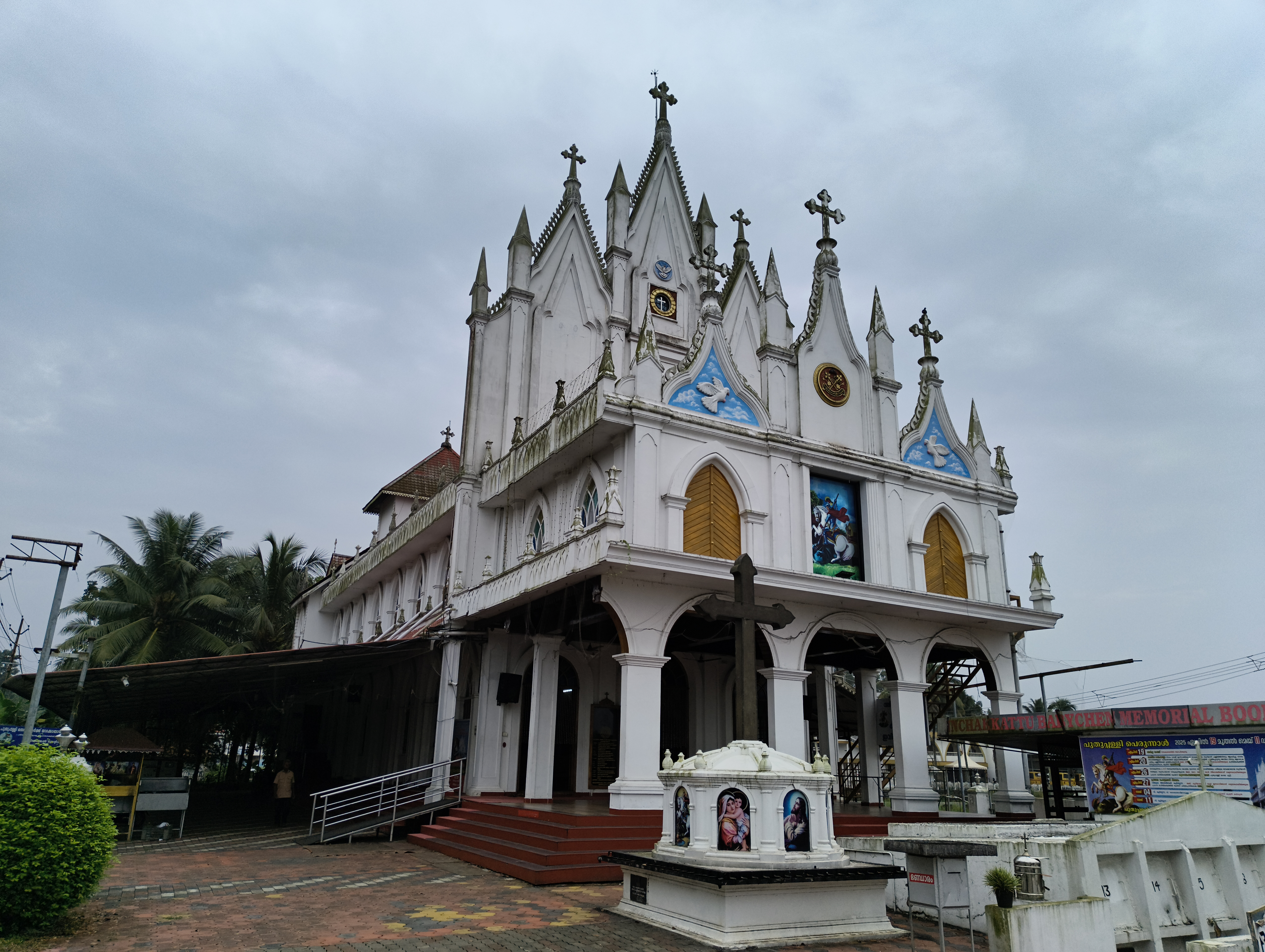
St. George Jacobite Syrian Orthodox Church, Puthupally

- St. George Orthodox Church, Puthuppally

== Notable people ==
- Oommen Chandy – Former Chief Minister of Kerala, Former Minister of Home Affairs, Former Minister of Finance and former MLA of Puthuppally
- Chandy Oommen - Oommen Chandy's son, incumbent MLA of Puthuppally, Supreme Court Lawyer, Lecturer
- Vettom Mani – Scholar / Author on Indian Puranas
- E. C. George Sudarshan – Scientist (Quantum Optics)

== Sports ==
Puthuppally is known for its native ball play which is organized annually. A ball which is made of leather is used. It is generally referred to as naadan panthu kali or tukal panthu kali. Kerala's Native Ball Association office is located in Puthuppally.
