= St. Alphonsa (disambiguation) =

Saint Alphonsa was an Indian Catholic nun and educator.

St. Alphonsa may also refer to:

== Churches ==
- Syro-Malabar Cathedral of St. Alphonsa, Preston
- St. Alphonsa Church, Bharanganam
- St. Alphonsa Syro-Malabar Catholic Church, Kukatpally

== Other uses ==
- St. Alphonsa School, Miraj
