= Alphonsa of the Immaculate Conception =

Catholic saint (1910–1946)

Saint Alphonsa Muttathupadathu FCC
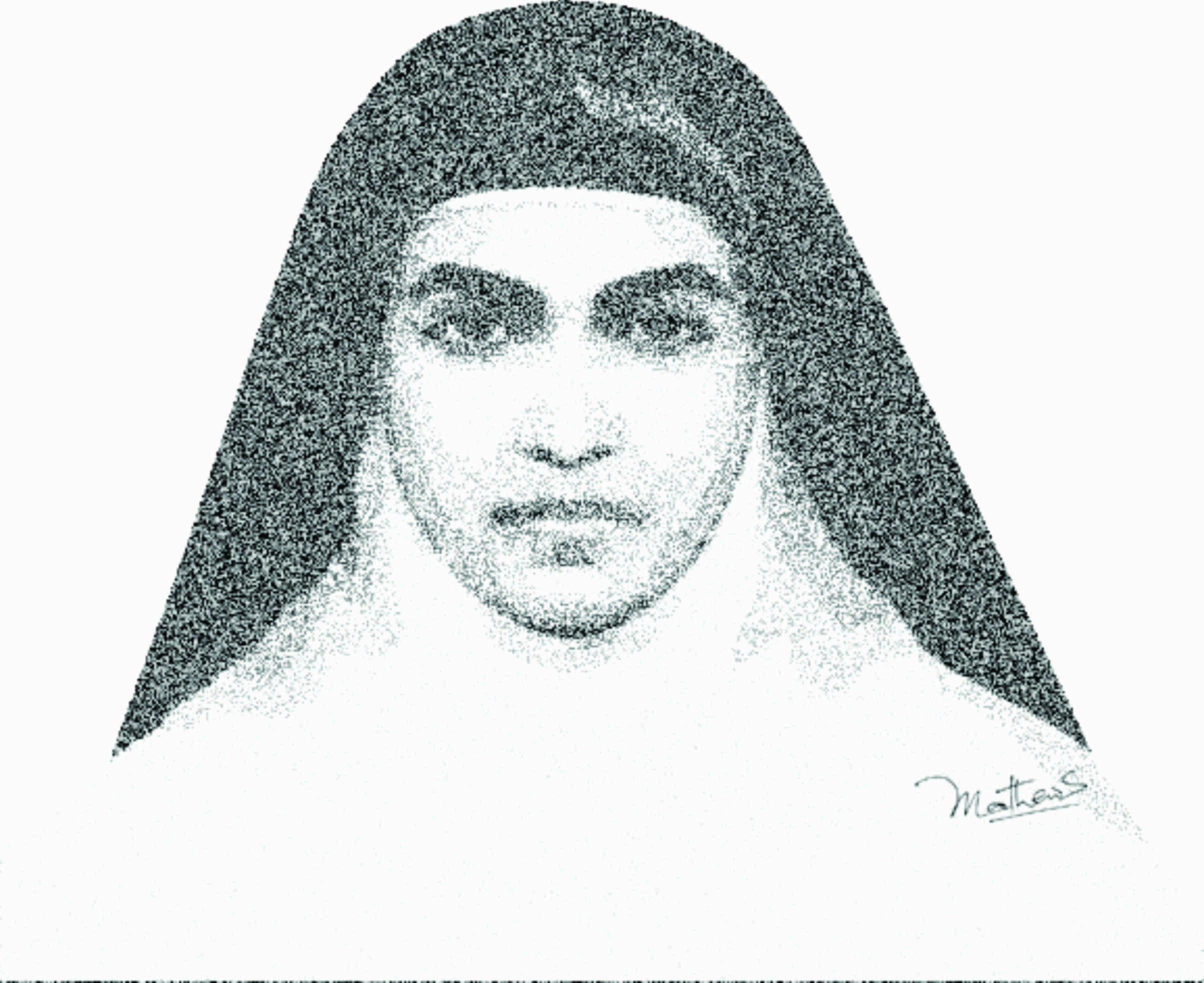
- Painting of Saint Alphonsa
- Born: 19 August 1910
- Died: 28 July 1946 (aged 35)
- Venerated in: Catholic Church
- Beatified: 8 February 1986
- Canonized: 12 October 2008, Vatican City by Pope Benedict XVI
- Major shrine: St. Mary's Syro-Malabar Church, Bharananganam, Kerala, India
- Feast: 28 July

Alphonsa of the Immaculate Conception (19 August 1910 – 28 July 1946), born as Anna Muttathupadathu, was an Indian Catholic nun and educator. She is the first woman of Indian origin to be canonized as a saint by the Catholic Church, and the first canonized saint of the Syro-Malabar Catholic Church.

Born in Kudamalur, Kerala, Alphonsa joined the Franciscan Clarist Congregation at a young age. She served as a teacher and faced numerous health challenges throughout her life. Despite her physical sufferings, she was known for her spiritual devotion and cheerful demeanor. Alphonsa's life was marked by simplicity and a deep commitment to her faith. She taught at St. Mary's High School in Bharananganam but her tenure was often interrupted by illness.

After her death in 1946, many people began to attribute miracles to her intercession. The process for her canonization began in 1955, and she was beatified by Pope John Paul II in 1986 during his visit to India. In the 1990s, a commemorative postal stamp was issued in her honor, marking her as the first woman from Kerala to be featured on an Indian stamp. Alphonsa was canonized on 12 October 2008 by Pope Benedict XVI, making her the first canonized saint from India.

St. Alphonsa is particularly venerated in Kerala, where her tomb at Bharananganam has become a pilgrimage site. Her feast day is observed annually on 28 July in the Syro-Malabar Catholic Church.

== Early life ==
Alphonsa, born as Anna Muttathupadathu on 19 August 1910, was a member of a Malankara Nasrani family. She was born in Kudamalur, a village in the princely state of Travancore, which later became part of Kerala. She was the daughter of Joseph Muttathupadathil and Mary Puthukari. Baptized on 27 August 1910, she was commonly known as Alphonsamma in her local community.

Nicknamed Annakutty ("little Anna") by her parents, Alphonsa's early life was marked by personal challenges, including the early loss of her mother. Following her mother's death, she was raised by her maternal aunt. Hagiographies recount her childhood as being difficult, characterized by the strict discipline of her aunt and foster mother, as well as teasing from her schoolmates. Her education was overseen by her great-uncle, Joseph Muttathupadathu.

In 1916, Alphonsa began her education in Arpookara and received her First Communion on 27 November 1917. After completing the initial cycle of schooling in 1920, she was transferred to Muttuchira, where she lived with her aunt Anna Murickan, as her mother had requested before her death. Raised in the prominent Murickan family, Alphonsa was exposed to stories of saints, prayers, and Christian songs by her grandmother.

During her adolescence, Alphonsa received several marriage proposals from well-known families. However, she felt a strong calling to religious life and desired to become a "bride of Christ," dedicating herself to serving others. This conviction was reportedly reinforced by a vision of Thérèse of Lisieux, a figure whom Alphonsa admired and considered a role model, and who she believed foretold her future sainthood.

In 1923, Alphonsa's feet were severely burned when she placed her feet into a pit of burning chaff. This injury was self-inflicted to prevent her foster mother from arranging a marriage for her, thereby allowing her to pursue her religious calling. The accident left her partially disabled for the remainder of her life.

== Vocation ==
=== Sister Alphonsa ===
Anna joined the Franciscan Clarist Congregation, a religious congregation of the Third Order of St. Francis, where she completed her education.

She arrived at the Clarist convent in Bharananganam, Kottayam district, on Pentecost Sunday in 1927. On August 2, 1928, she received the postulant's veil and took the name Alphonsa of the Immaculate Conception, in honor of Alphonsus Liguori, whose feast day fell on that date. In May 1929, Alphonsa began teaching at Malayalam High School in Vazhappally. After the death of her foster mother in 1930, she resumed her studies in Changanacherry while working as a temporary teacher in Vakakkad. On May 19, 1930, Alphonsa entered the novitiate at Bharananganam. After completing her novitiate on August 11, 1931, she took her first vows and became a fully professed member of the religious order. Alphonsa sought to model her work as a nun after Thérèse of Lisieux.

=== Health decline ===
Between 1930 and 1935, Alphonsa experienced significant health issues. She took her permanent religious vows on August 12, 1936. Two days later, she returned to Bharananganam from Changanacherry. She briefly taught at St. Alphonsa Girl's High School, but her poor health often prevented her from fulfilling her duties. Throughout her years as a member of the Clarist congregation, Alphonsa dealt with severe illness.

In December 1936, it was claimed that she recovered from her ailments due to the intercession of Kuriakose Elias Chavara, though she continued to experience health issues. On June 14, 1939, she suffered a severe bout of pneumonia, which further weakened her. On October 18, 1940, an intruder entered her room at night, causing her to experience shock and temporary amnesia, which worsened her condition.

Her health continued to decline over the following months, and she received the sacrament of Anointing of the sick on September 29, 1941. The next day, it is reported that she regained her memory, although her health remained fragile. Despite some improvement over the next few years, she developed gastroenteritis and liver issues in July 1945, leading to violent convulsions and vomiting. During the final year of her life, she became acquainted with Sebastian Valopilly, who later became a bishop in Kerala. Valopilly frequently administered communion to her and became known for his efforts to support marginalized communities in the region.

== Death ==
Sr. Alphonsa died on July 28, 1946, at the age of 35, following a series of health complications. She was buried at St. Mary's Catholic Church in Bharananganam within the Diocese of Palai. Her funeral was attended by a large number of people. Rev. Fr. Romulus CMI delivered the funeral oration, in which he compared her life of quiet devotion to that of St. Thérèse of Lisieux. He expressed hope rather than sorrow, suggesting that Alphonsa was now an intercessor in heaven, and speculated that her grave might become a site of pilgrimage.

== Veneration ==
Claims of her miraculous intervention began almost immediately upon her death and often involved the children of the convent school where she used to teach. On 2 December 1953, Cardinal Eugène Tisserant inaugurated the diocesan process for her beatification and Alphonsa was declared a Servant of God.

In 1985, Pope John Paul II formally approved a miracle attributed to her intercession and on 9 July she became "Venerable Sister Alphonsa".

=== Beatification ===
Alphonsa was beatified along with Kuriakose Elias Chavara at Kottayam, on 8 February 1986 by Pope John Paul II during his apostolic pilgrimage to India.

During his speech at Nehru Stadium, the Pope said:

From early in her life, Sister Alphonsa experienced great suffering. With the passing of the years, the heavenly Father gave her an ever fuller share in the Passion of his beloved Son. We recall how she experienced not only physical pain of great intensity, but also the spiritual suffering of being misunderstood and misjudged by others. But she constantly accepted all her sufferings with serenity and trust in God. ... She wrote to her spiritual director: "Dear Father, as my good Lord Jesus loves me so very much, I sincerely desire to remain on this sick bed and suffer not only this, but anything else besides, even to the end of the world. I feel now that God has intended my life to be an oblation, a sacrifice of suffering" (20 November 1944). She came to love suffering because she loved the suffering Christ. She learned to love the Cross through her love of the crucified Lord.

=== Miracles ===
Hundreds of miraculous cures are claimed from her intervention, many of which involve straightening of clubbed feet, possibly because she has lived with deformed feet herself. Two of these cases were submitted to the Congregation for the Causes of Saints as proof of her miraculous intervention. The continuing cures are chronicled in the magazine PassionFlower.

Bishop Sebastian reported:

About ten years ago, when I was in a small village in Wayanad outside Manatavady, I saw a boy walking with some difficulty, using a stick. As he approached me I noted that both of his feet were turned upside down. I had a stack of holy cards in my pocket with Alphonsa's picture on them, so I pulled one of them out and gave it to the boy. When I told the boy that he should pray to this woman for the cure of his feet, the boy – he was quite smart for a ten-year-old boy – replied: "But I'm a Muslim, and, besides, I was born this way." I replied that God is very powerful, so let's pray. A few months later, a boy and a gentleman appeared at the house here. I didn't recognize them at first but soon learned that it was the Muslim boy with his father, here to tell me that his feet had been cured through their prayers to Sister Alphonsa. They showed me the calluses on the tops of his feet, and you could see the marks which had been made from the years of his walking with his feet turned under. Before they left, the three of us had our pictures taken.

The boy had reportedly taken Alphonsa's picture card and asked Alphonsa to help fix his feet. Several days afterwards one of his feet supposedly turned around. He and the other members of his family then prayed for the cure of the second foot, which also supposedly turned around later.

=== Canonization ===
On Sunday, 12 October 2008, Pope Benedict XVI announced her canonization at a ceremony at Saint Peter's Square. Indians from across the world, especially people from Kerala, gathered at the ceremony in Rome. Among them was a 10-year-old Kerala boy Jinil Joseph whose clubfoot – a birth defect – was, in the judgment of Vatican officials, miraculously healed after prayers to Alphonsa in 1999.

The final ceremony for the canonization began with the holy relics of Alphonsa being presented to the Pope by Sister Celia, Mother General of the Franciscan Clarist Congregation, the congregation to which Alphonsa belonged. Celia was accompanied by Vice Postulator Francis Vadakkel and former Kerala minister K. M. Mani, all holding lit candles. Speaking in English, the Pope declared Alphonsa a saint, after reading excerpts from the Bible. The Pope himself read out the biography of Alphonsa after the ceremony.

In the homily, Pope Benedict XVI recalled Alphonsa's life as one of "extreme physical and spiritual suffering".

This exceptional woman ... was convinced that her cross was the very means of reaching the heavenly banquet prepared for her by the Father, By accepting the invitation to the wedding feast, and by adorning herself with the garment of God's grace through prayer and penance, she conformed her life to Christ's and now delights in the "rich fare and choice wines" of the heavenly kingdom.

"(Her) heroic virtues of patience, fortitude and perseverance in the midst of deep suffering remind us that God always provides the strength we need to overcome every trial," the pope stated before the ceremony ended.

The canonization was greeted with the bursting of firecrackers and the toll of church bells. St Mary's Forane church at Kudmaloor, her home parish, also celebrated a special Mass. The grave at St. Mary's Forane Church, Bharananganam where the Franciscan Clarist Sister was buried had a chapel built there, which houses her mortal remains.

== Legacy ==
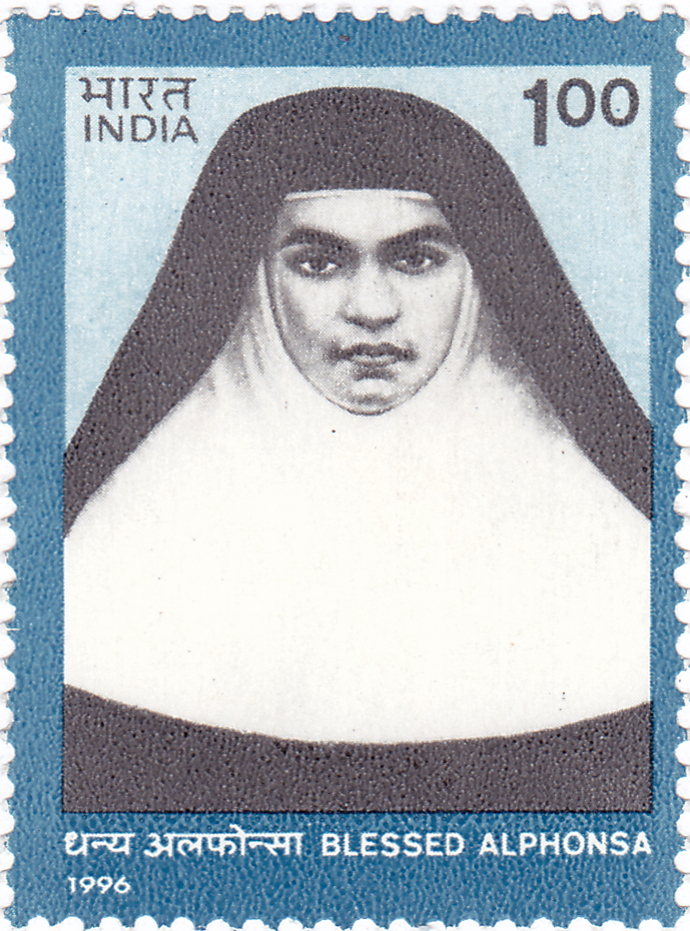
A stamp of India with a portrait of Blessed Alphonsa from 1996

=== Shrine ===
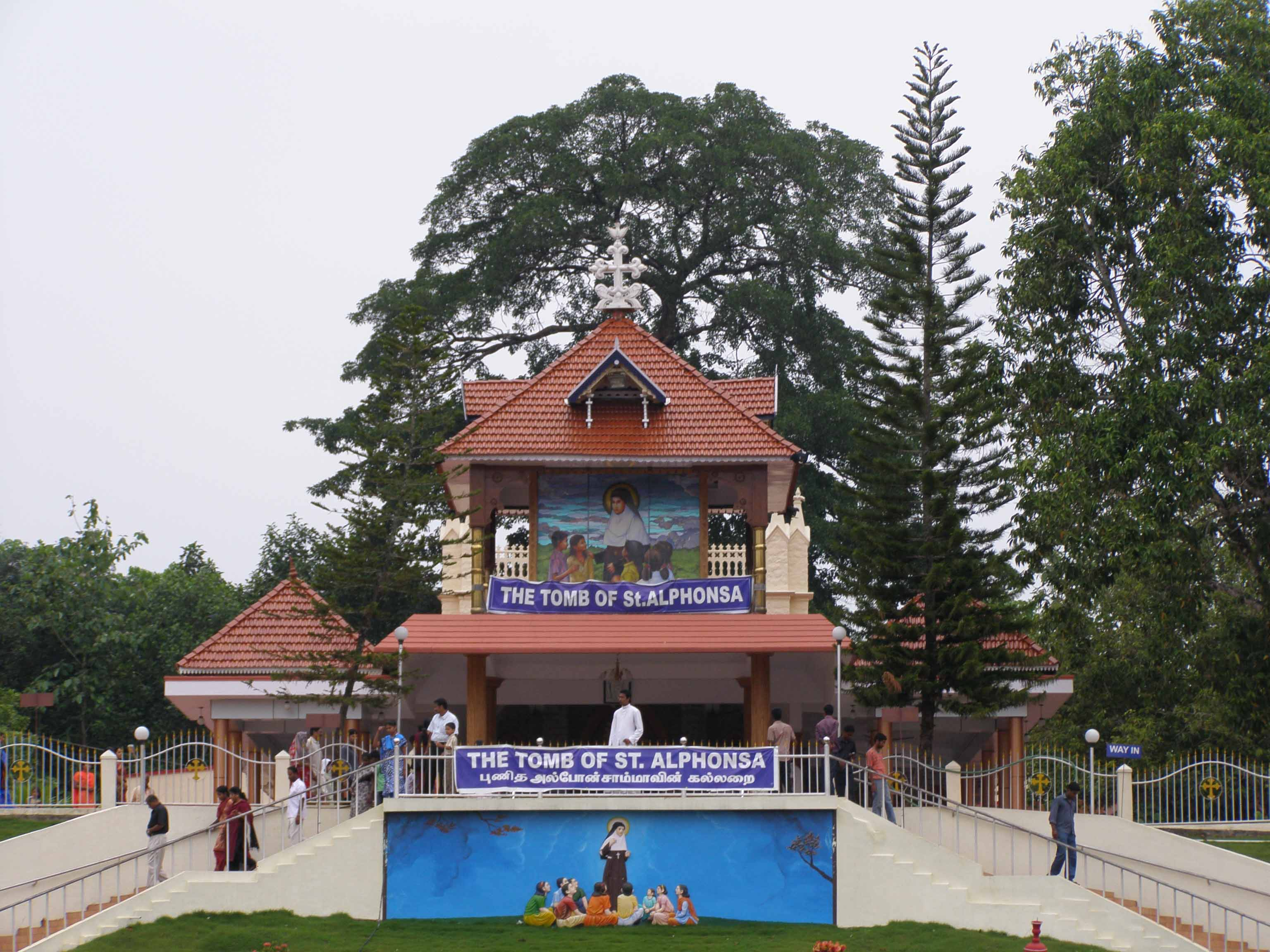
Tomb of Saint Alphonsa

Her tomb at St. Mary's Syro-Malabar Catholic Church, Bharananganam, has become a pilgrimage site as miracles have been reported by some of the faithful. St. Alphonsa church Parathi, Mayam in Thiruvananthapuram district holds the distinction of being the first church in Kerala to be dedicated to St. Alphonsa. Consecrated in 1988 by Bishop Joseph Powathil, the shrine attracts numerous devotees who brave challenging circumstances, including crossing the Neyyar river, to seek the saint's intercession

St. Alphonsa Church Valiyakolly is known as the "Bharanaganam of North Kerala" (unofficial). This church is under the diocese of Thamarassery. Valiyakolly church is the first church named after Alphonsa in the diocese. And hence this church is one of the main pilgrimage centers of Saint Alphonsa in North Kerala. Novena on the name of Saint Alphonsa is being conducted here on every Friday evening.

=== Feast ===
Thousands of people converge on the small town of Bharananganam when they celebrate the feast of Saint Alphonsa from 19 to 28 July each year; her tomb has been designated as a pilgrimage site with numerous miracles being reported by pious devotees.

=== Institutions named after Saint Alphonsa ===
The first institution named after Saint Alphonsa is Sister Alphonsa's UP School, Chennamattom near Ayarkunnam in Kottayam, which was established in 1948, just 2 years after her death. Other prominent institutions like Alphonsa College, Pala, est 1964, were named after her. However, the number of institutions grew significantly after she was beatified in 1986 by Pope John Paul the Second and after her canonization in October 2008 by Pope Benedict XVI. Now there are churches named after her in many parts of the world, including St Alphonsa Syro Malabar Catholic Cathedral, Mississauga and St Alphonsa Syro Malabar Forane Church, Edmonton in Canada.

=== Documentary TV series ===
In 2008, Sibi Yogiaveedan directed a documentary series about Alphonsa, titled Vishudha Alphonsama: The Passion Flower, for Shalom TV. The series features interviews with Alphonsa's childhood friends and relatives, offering insights into her life. Alphonsa's character was portrayed by actress Nikhila Vimal. The documentary was produced in Malayalam, with English subtitles provided.

In 2009, the Reserve Bank of India issued a 5-rupee commemorative coin to mark the birth centenary of Alphonsa.

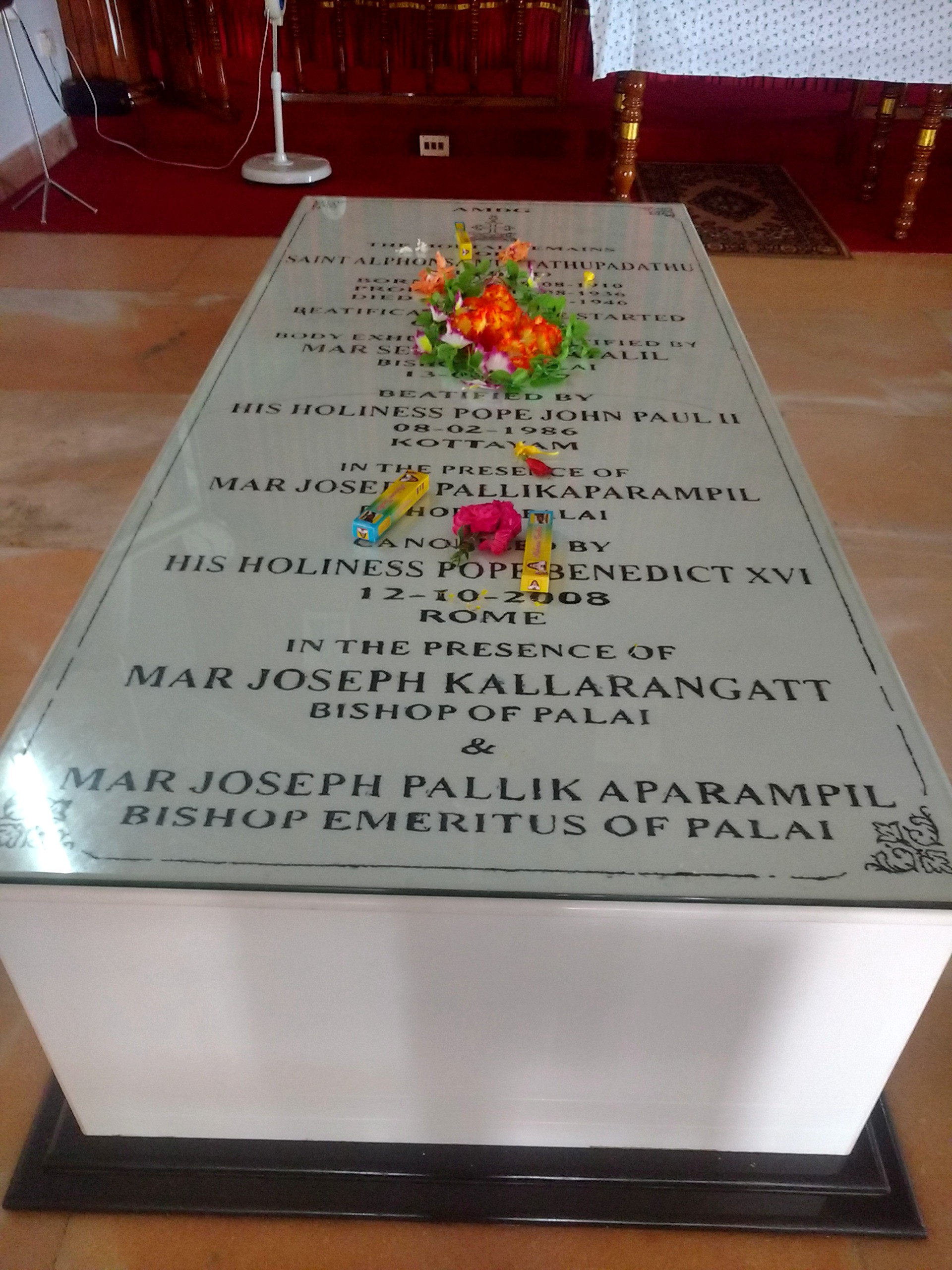
Tomb of Saint Alphonsa, St. Mary's Syro-Malabar Church, Bharananganam, Kerala, India

== Image Gallery ==
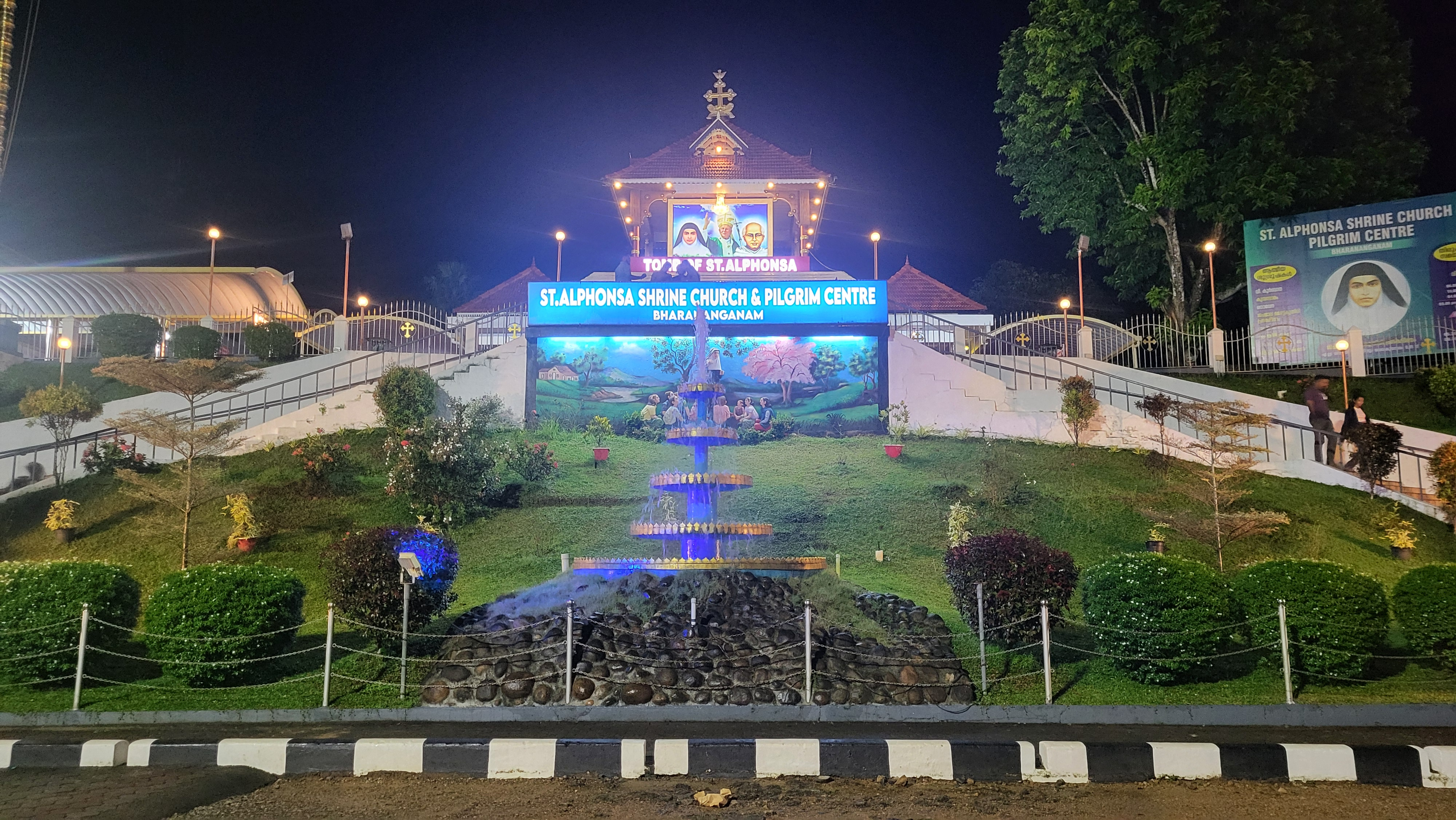

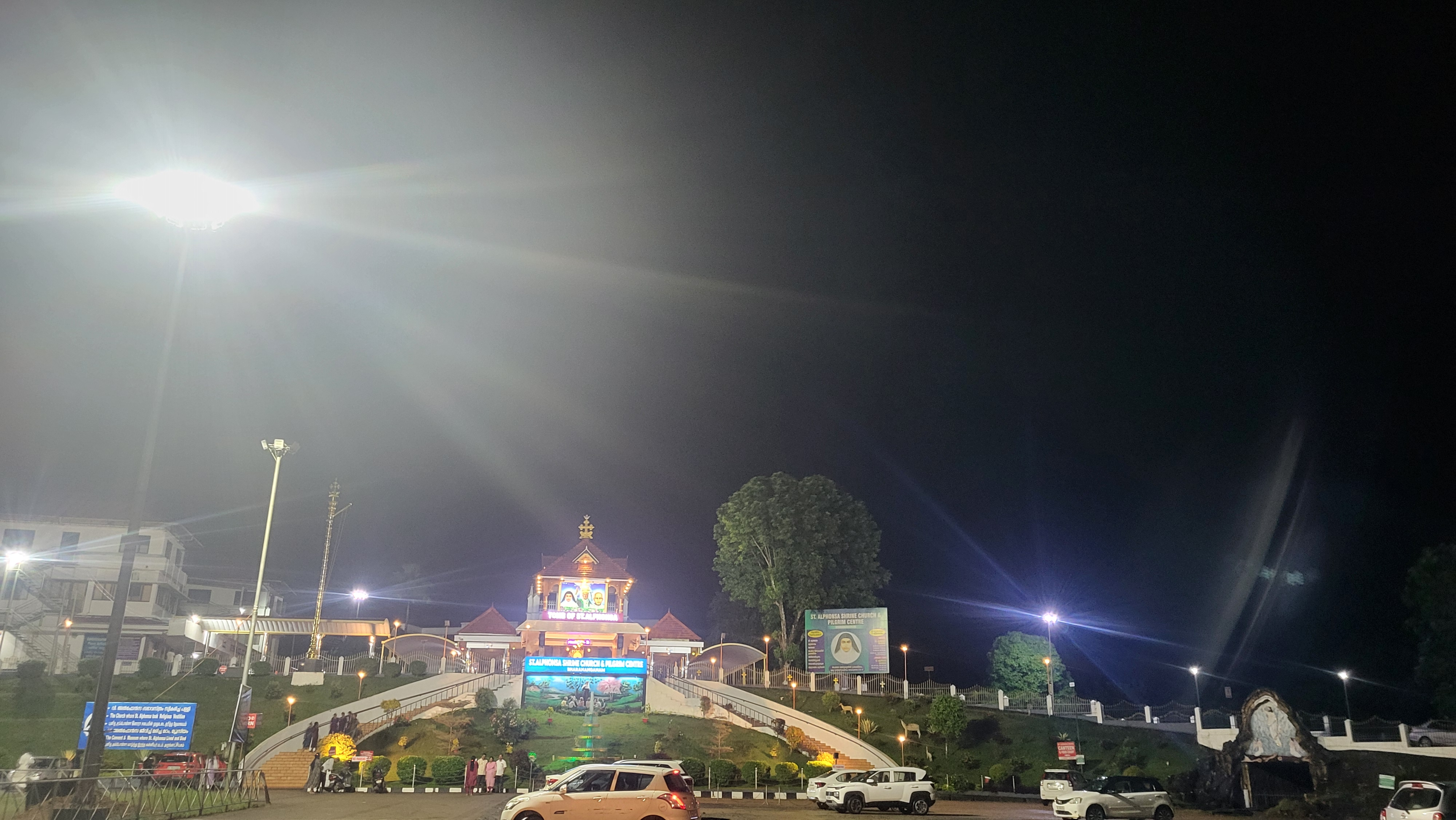

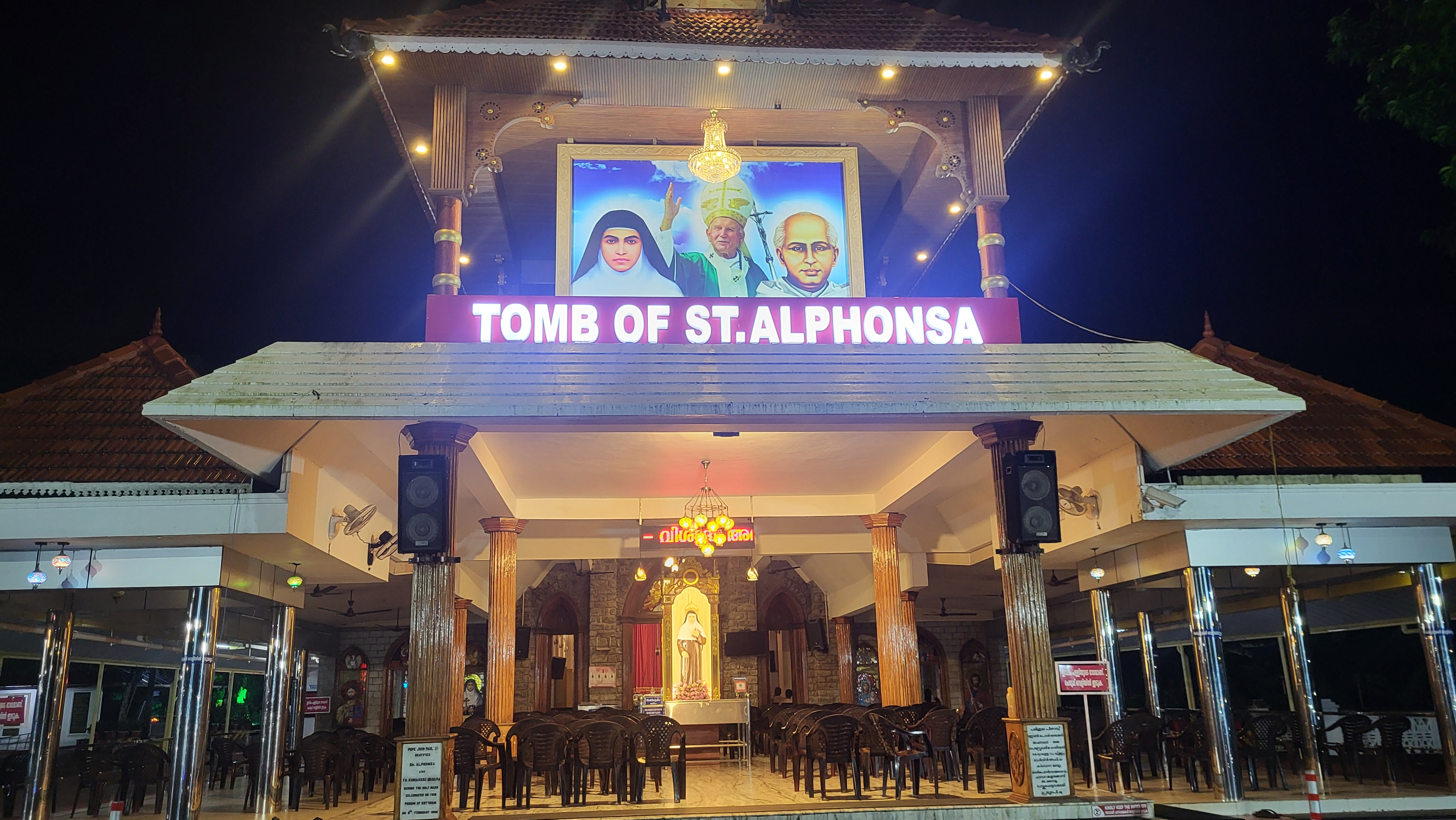

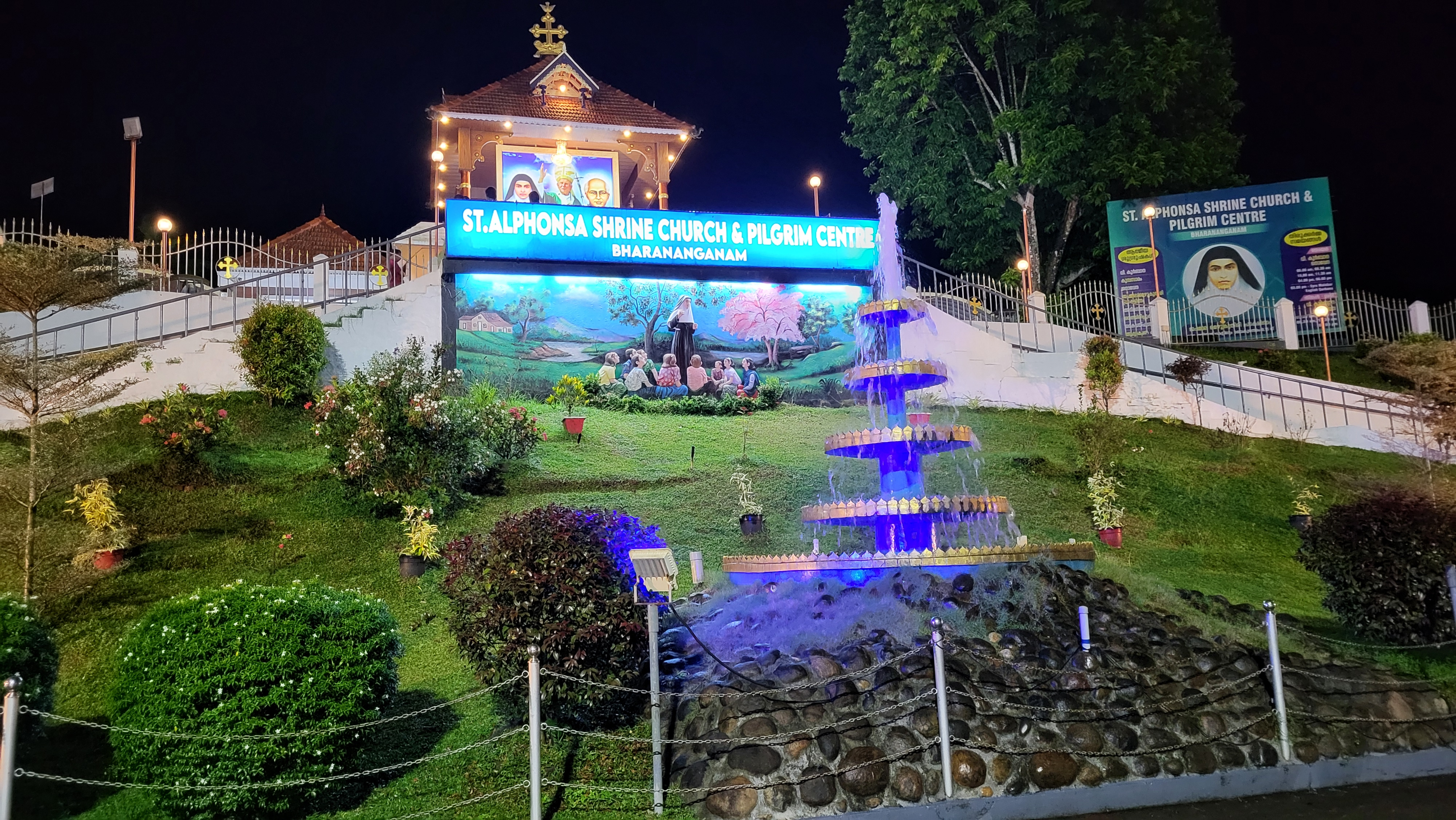

== See also ==
- Euphrasia Eluvathingal
- Catholic Church in India
