= St. Joseph's Parish Shrine, Pavaratty =

St. Joseph's Parish Shrine
- St. Joseph's Parish Shrine, Pavaratty
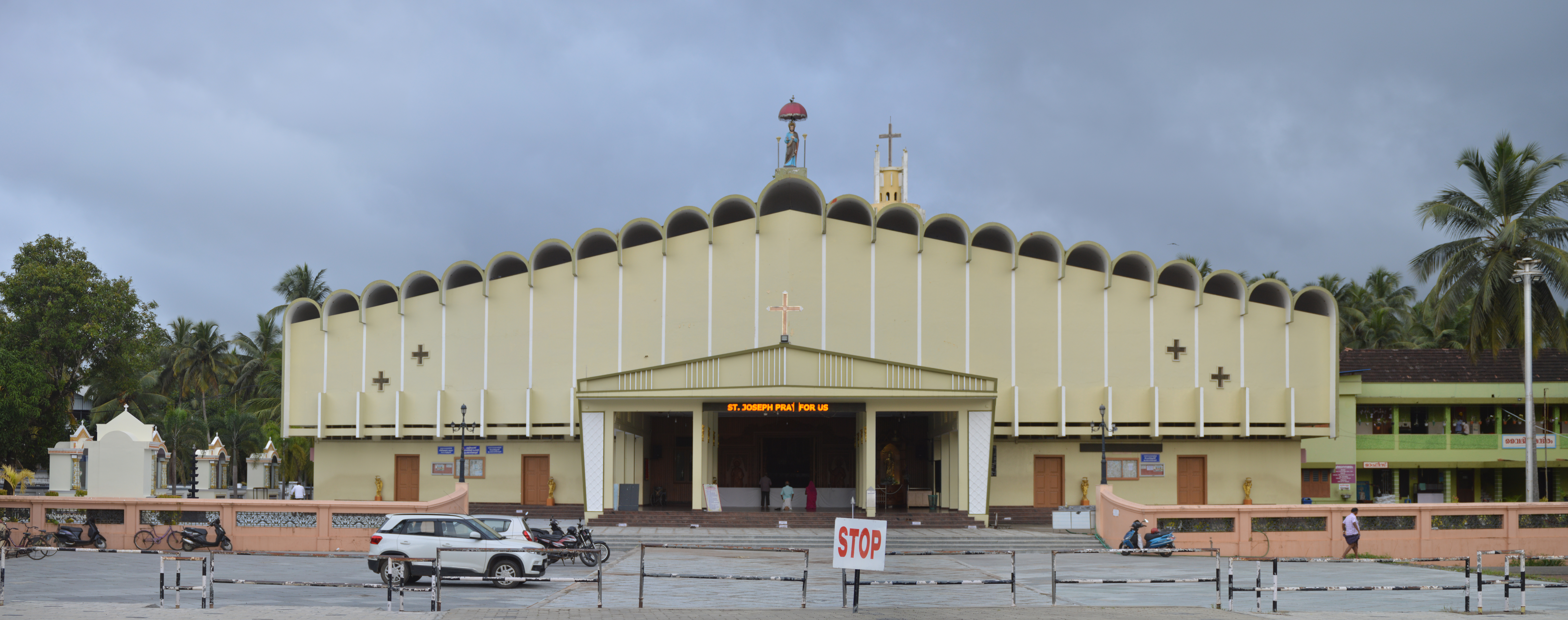

- Location of St. Joseph's Parish Shrine, Pavaratty in Kerala.
- 10.563231°N 76.062865°E
- Location: Chavakkad, Thrissur district, Kerala
- Country: India
- Denomination: Syro-Malabar Catholic
- Website: www.pavarattyshrine.com

History
- Founded: April 13, 1876; 150 years ago

Administration
- Archdiocese: Metropolitan Archeparchy of Thrissur

St. Joseph's Parish Shrine, Pavaratty is a Christian church located in Kerala, India. Located in a small town named Pavaratty, the church is popularly known as Pavaratty Palli. It is a parish of Syro-malabar traditions under the auspices of the Syro Malabar Catholic Archeparchy of Thrissur. The first structure of this church was blessed on 13 April 1876. It is exactly 4.4 km away from Palayur Mar Thoma Major Archiepiscopal Church. The church is also under the Palayur Mar Thoma Major Archiepiscopal Church Forane. Considering the importance of this church as a pilgrim centre, the Indian postal department has provided a pictorial cancellation stamp for Pavaratty post office from 13 May 1996. It is recognized as the biggest church dedicated to St. Joseph in Asia. Unlike most of Thrissur district, which was historically part of Cochin state, Pavaratty along with Guruvayur formed part of the erstwhile Kozhikode headquartered Malabar district.

== Overview ==
St. Joseph's Parish Shrine, Pavaratty is a Christian church located in Thrissur district of Kerala, India. Located in a small town named Pavaratty, the church is popularly known as Pavaratty Palli. It is a parish of Syro-malabar traditions under the auspices of the Syro Malabar Catholic Archeparchy of Thrissur.

== History ==
The Pavaratty area was once under the Chittattukara Parish. Since the Chittattukara church is little far from Pavaratty, people of Pavaratty requested to extend the commencement of Tirukarma ceremonies a little. But the church officials ignored the requests, so the believers from Pavaratty decided to build a church of their own, which later became St. Joseph's Church.

The simple church structure was blessed on 13 April 1876, on a Maundy Thursday. After that, they set out to construct a permanent church building and it was completed in 1880. To accommodate more people in the church hall, in 1934, a spacious hall constructed facing the main altar from the southern side, and in 1961 another one was constructed to the Northern side. The church was renovated in 1975 and later in 2004. The altar of the church which was built in the Portuguese style of architecture, was kept unchanged during these renovations.

== Geography ==
The church is located in Pavaratty town in Chavakkad taluk, Thrissur district, Kerala. The church is located 23 km northwest of Thrissur and 4 km south of Guruvayur. The nearest railway station is Guruvayur and the nearest airport is Kochi International Airport (59 km).

== Church feast ==
The annual grand feast of the shrine falls on the third Sunday after Easter. It is one of the most significant church festivals of Kerala. In 2019, it was the 143rd annual festival.

At the last day, the feast is concluded with a mass procession carrying the holy images along with golden crosses and decorated umbrellas. The images of St. Joseph, the Virgin Mary, and the Apostle Peter were carried in a decorated cenotaph along the procession route. People singing prayer songs and playing musical instruments accompanies with the procession.

The fireworks connected to the grand annual feast on the third Sunday after Easter is famous. Following the Kollam Puttingal temple fire disaster, the fireworks display, which had been held for 140 years, did not receive permission from the government in 2018. Following this, the church authorities prepared a safe digital fireworks display that year. The 2024 fireworks display was carried out with utmost precautions and regulations as per the instructions of the Kerala High Court. Permission for fireworks was denied in 2025 as well, following the firework accidents that occurred in Thrissur, Ernakulam and Kasaragod districts.

In 2020, the festival was cancelled due to corona prevention protocols. On that day, the church was closed to the public and only important ceremonies related to the festival were held by the authorities.

== Honors ==
The Indian Postal Department issues a special pictorial cancellation stamp to post offices connected to popular tourist destinations and pilgrimages in India. The postal department has provided pictorial cancellation at Pavaratty post office from 13 May 1996. Pavaratti Church is the fourth Christian church in Kerala to receive this honor (Malayattoor Church, Bharananganam Church and Palayur Church are the other three churches).

== Institutions under the church ==
=== Schools ===
- St. Lois LP School, Venmenad (Started in 1903)
- St. Joseph's LP School, Pavaratty (started in 1908)
- St. Antony's UP School, Poovathur (Started in 1925)
- St. Mary's LP School, Puthumanassery (Started in 1925)
- Sanjoe's School of Nursing, Pavaratty (Started in 1994)

=== Hospitals ===
- Sanjoe's Parish Hospital, Pavaratty (Started in 1949)
