= Pavaratty =

- Census town
- Location in Kerala, India
- Coordinates: 10.5646°N 76.0625°E
- Country: India
- State: Kerala
- District: Thrissur

Government
  - Body: Pavartty Grama Panchayath

Population (2001)
  - Total: 10,823

Languages
  - Official: Malayalam, English
- Time zone: UTC+5:30 (IST)
- Vehicle registration: KL 46

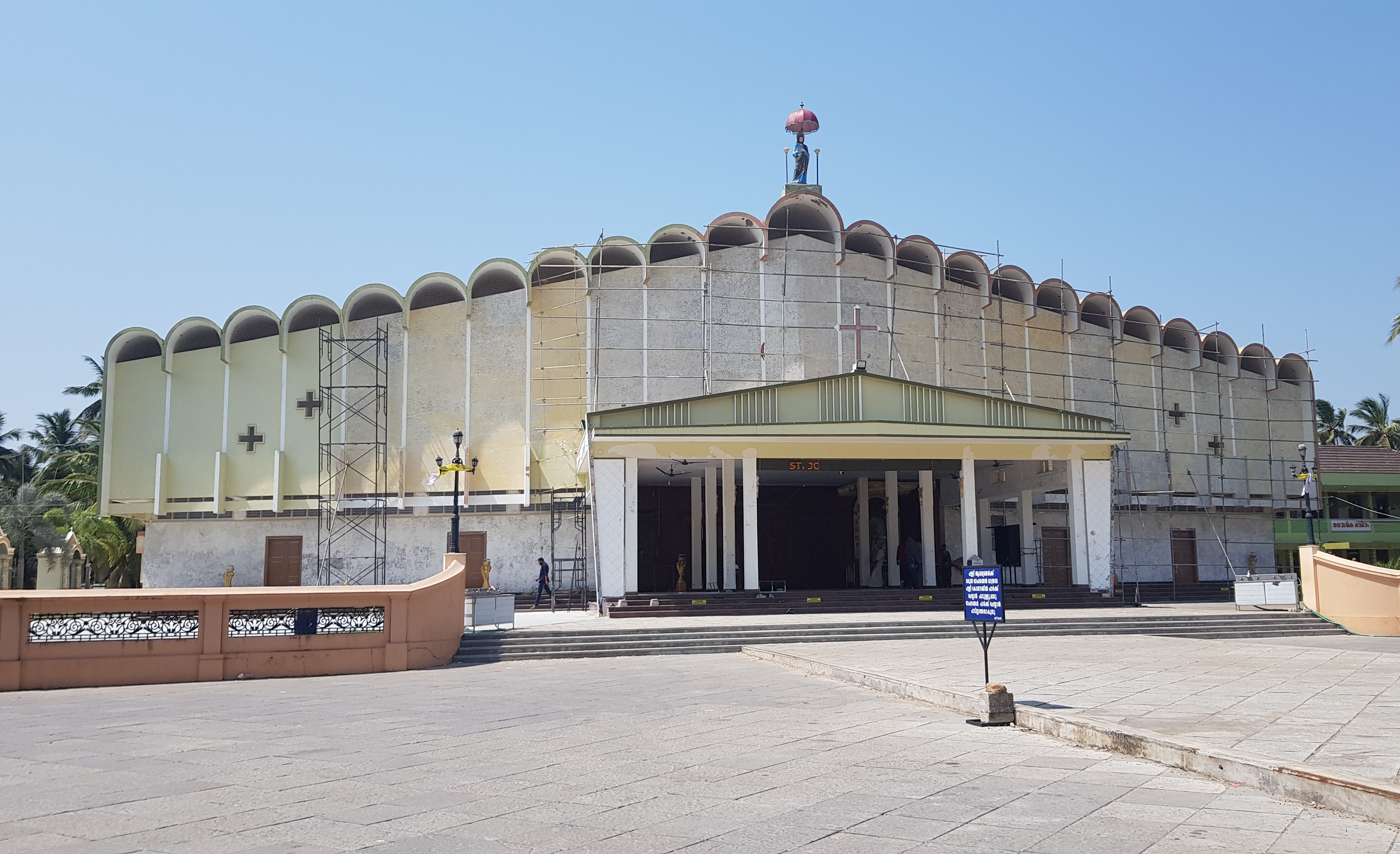
St. joseph's church, Pavaratty

Pavaratty is a census town in Thrissur district in the Indian state of Kerala. Pavaratty is situated in the coastal area of Chavakkad taluk in Thrissur District. The town is about 23 km northwest of Thrissur town and 5 km south of Guruvayoor. It is the site of St. Joseph's Parish Shrine, Pavaratty and also lies near Palayur (4 km), famous for the Palayur Church. Nearby airports are Cochin International Airport (77 km) and Calicut Airport (95 km). The nearest railheads are at Guruvayoor and Thrissur. The Nearest bus stations are Thrissur Bus Station and Guruvayoor Bus Station. From Thrissur, the shortest way to Pavaratty is via Amala-Parappur-Puvathur. Unlike most of Thrissur district, which was historically part of Cochin state, Pavaratty along with Guruvayur formed part of the erstwhile Kozhikode headquartered Malabar district.

== History of Pavaratty ==
The area called Pavaratty, there are many speculations behind the name of this locality. Some may doubt relations with "Paav – Roti", Andhra Bread. Again many others try to find out a connection between this locality and the English word – 'poverty'. But the older generation is for another view. In old days there were many looms in and around this area. The weavers of this locality used to run the shuttle twice (Paav) twisting the time of thread – "Paav" – put twice (iratty). Anyhow this locality had a significant role in various fields.

== Architecture ==
As for regional architecture, "Pavaratty Finish" is defined as a smooth, marble-like finish made using colored cement and which became well known through Pavaratty artisans in Kerala. The locality called Pavaratty Centre was earlier referred to as Kavalapara, owing to the presence of a police post in that locality.

== Churches ==
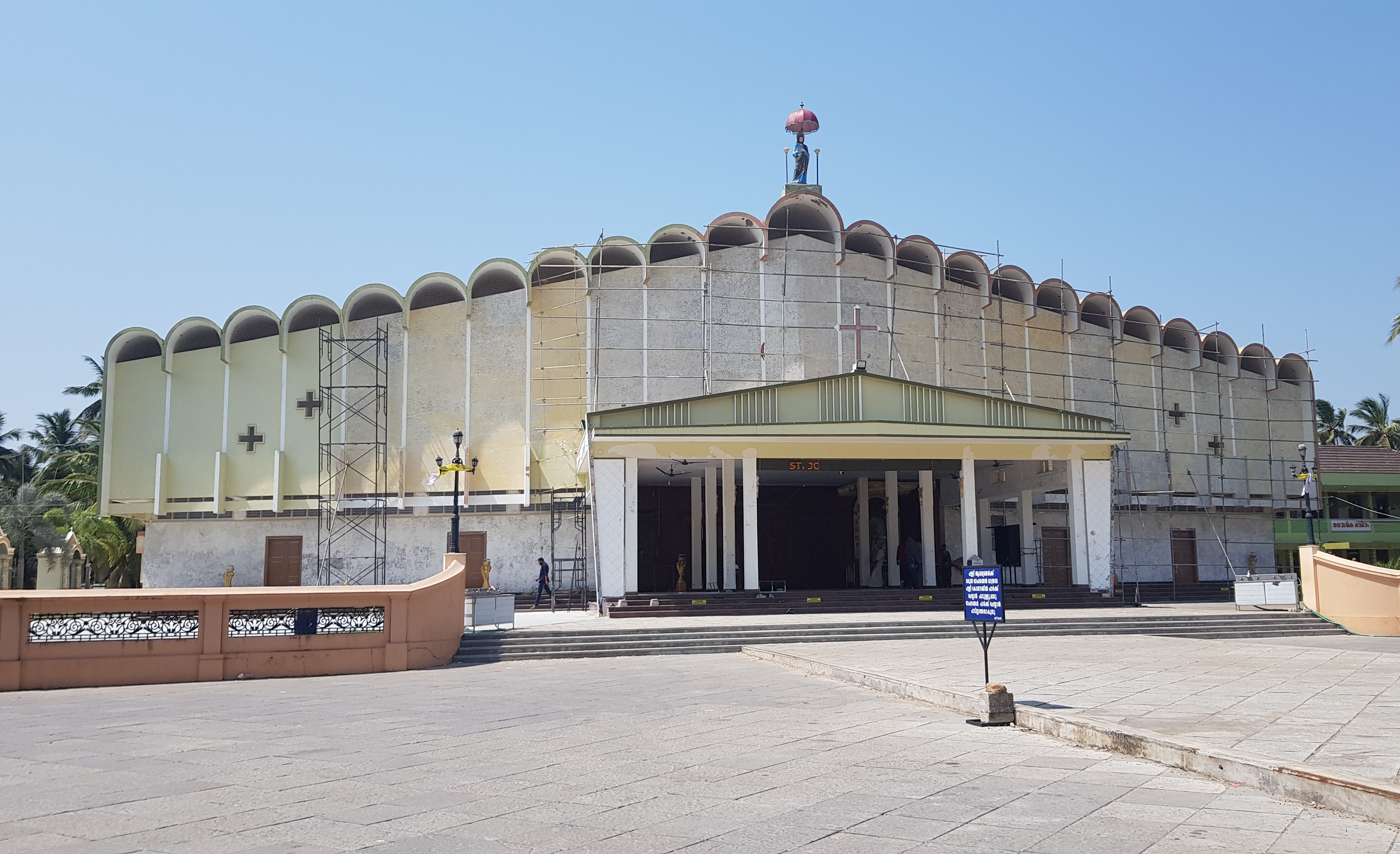
St. joseph's church

St. Joseph's Parish Shrine, Pavaratty popularly known as Pavaratty Palli is a Christian church located in Pavaratty. It is a parish of Syro-malabar traditions under the auspices of the Roman Catholic Arch-diocese of Thrissur. The first structure of this church was blessed on 13 April 1876.The simple church structure was blessed on 13 April 1876, on a Maundy Thursday. After that, they set out to construct a permanent church building and it was completed in 1880.

== Demographics ==
As of 2001 India census, Pavaratty had a population of 10,823. Males constitute 45% of the population and females 55%. Pavaratty has an average literacy rate of 84%, higher than the national average of 59.5%: male literacy is 85%, and female literacy is 83%. In Pavaratty, 11% of the population is under 6 years of age.

== Educational Institutions near by Pavaratty ==
Sir Syed English School, Pavaratty, recognised by CBSE, working since 1995. 04872644764

St.Joseph's College of Arts & Science, Mother Arts & Science College (unaided-Recognised by University of Calicut) Address : Poovathur; near by Peruvallur; Thrissur.

THOIBA women's college [WAFIYYA] Venmenad

Under [cicwafy]

Al Birr Islamic pre school Venmenad

Tourist place

Koorikkad; painkanniyuur
