= St. Mary's Forane Church, Bharananganam =

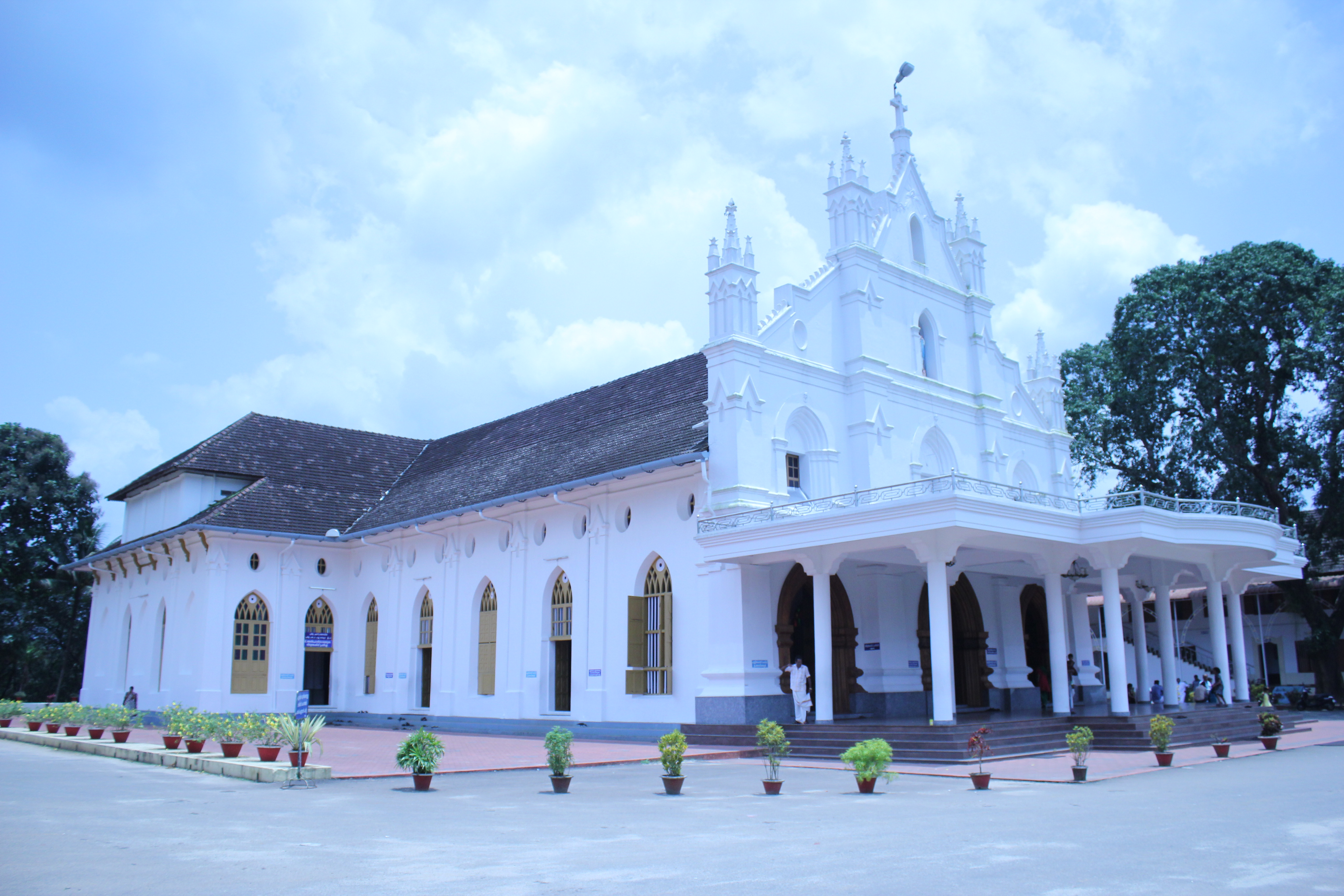
- St. Mary's Forane Church, Bharananganam

- 9°42′00″N 76°43′40″E
- Location: Bharananganam, Kottayam district, Kerala
- Country: India
- Denomination: Syro-Malabar Catholic Church

History
- Founded: 1004; 1022 years ago
- Dedication: Saint Mary

Architecture
- Architectural type: Modern

Administration
- District: Kottayam
- Archdiocese: Palai

Clergy
- Archbishop: Raphael Thattil
- Vicar: Fr. Attappatt Zacharias

St. Mary's Forane Church, Bharananganam (established in 1004 A.D.) is a Syro-Malabar Catholic church located in Kottayam district of Kerala, India. Located in a small town named Anakkallu in Bharananganam, the church is also known as Bharananganam Church or Anakkallu church. It is one of the oldest church and Christian pilgrim centre in Kottayam district.

The tomb of Saint Alphonsa is in this church. The podium where Pope John Paul II addressed the audience in 1986, was also removed and preserved as a monument in the church.

== Etymology ==
When they prepared to build a church in Bharanganam, there was a big dispute among the locals about where to build it. When it was not possible to find a solution to this, a decision was made that a stone can be placed in the elephant's trunk and a church can be built wherever the elephant places the stone. It is believed that the place where the elephant laid the stone was later known as Anakkallu (combination of two Malayalam words "Ana" (meaning elephant) and "kallu" (meaning stone)) and the church built there was known as Anakkallu Palli.

== Parishes under this Forane ==
Amparanirappel St. John's Church (established 21 August 1917), Choondachery St. Joseph's Church (established 24 July 1994), Edappady St. Joseph's Church (established 1886), Idamattom St. Michael's Church (established 15 July 1865), Kizhaparayar St. Gregorios Church (established 17 November 1926), Mallikassery St. Thomas Church (established 1954), Paika St. Joseph's Church (established 1901), Plassanal St. Mary's Church (established 16 July 1848), Poovathodu St. Thomas Church (established 1887) and Vilakkumadom St. Fransis Xavier Church (established 1849) are the parishes under this Forane.

== St. Alphonsa Church, Bharanganam ==
A cemetery chapel of St. Mary's Church was started in 1945. The tomb of Saint Alphonsa was in that cemetery chapel. On 12 October 2008, after Alphonsama was beatified, a church was built there and was named St. Alphonsa Church. Thousands of devotees come and participate in this feast associated with the anniversary of Saint Alphonsa's death, on July 28 every year in the church.

Almost 40 years after Alphonsa's death, on February 8, 1986, Pope John Paul II beatified Alphonsa and Kuriakose Elias Chavara on the same day at Nehru stadium in Kottayam. The podium where Pope John Paul addressed the audience and conducted the Mass in February 1986, was also removed and preserved as a monument in the church, in front of the tomb of Saint Alphonsa. The Alphonsa Museum, which houses hundreds of exhibits related to the life of Saint Alphonsa, is also located in the chapel compound.

== Honors ==
The Indian Postal Department issues a special pictorial cancellation stamp to post offices connected to popular tourist destinations and pilgrimages in India. Bharananganam Church is one of the third Christian churches in Kerala to receive this honor (Malayattoor Church and Pavaratty Church are the other two churches).
