= Nehru Stadium, Kottayam =

Sports stadium in Kottayam, Kerala, India

Jawaharlal Nehru Stadium
- നാഗമ്പടം സ്റ്റേഡിയം
- Location: Kottayam, Kerala
- Country: India
- Establishment: 1972
- Capacity: 18,000
- Owner: Government of Kerala
- Architect: n/a
- Operator: Kottayam Municipality
- End names
- Green Park End; Bridge End
- As of 25 July 2015; Source: ESPNcricinfo

Jawaharlal Nehru Stadium is a multi-purpose stadium in Kottayam, Kerala. The ground is mostly used for athletics and football. It is one of the Indian stadiums named after Jawaharlal Nehru.

The ground has capacity of 18,000 person was established in 1972. The stadium has hosted cricket matches from 1972 to 1993 which in five first-class matches and two List A matches. The stadium went for renovation in 2014 with a swimming pool, synthetic track, basketball & tennis courts etc.
