= Vavakkad =

Vavakkad Baby Forest
- village
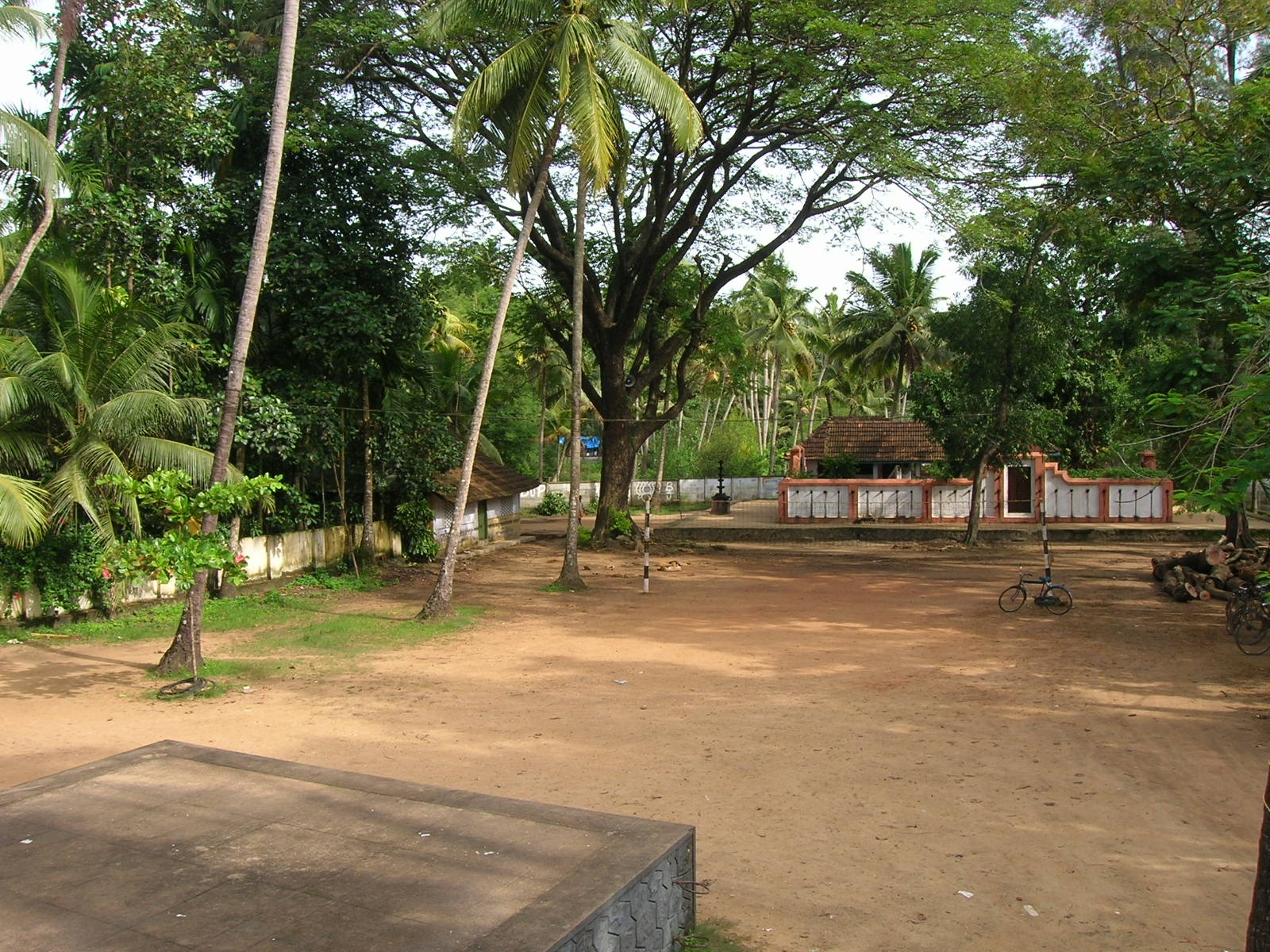
- Interactive map of Vavakkad
- Coordinates: 10.175499°N 76.196124°E
- Country: India
- State: Kerala
- District: Ernakulam

Languages
  - Official: Malayalam, English
- Time zone: UTC+5:30 (IST)
- PIN: 683516
- Telephone code: 91-484
- Vehicle registration: KL-42
- Climate: Tropical wet locator_position = right (Köppen)

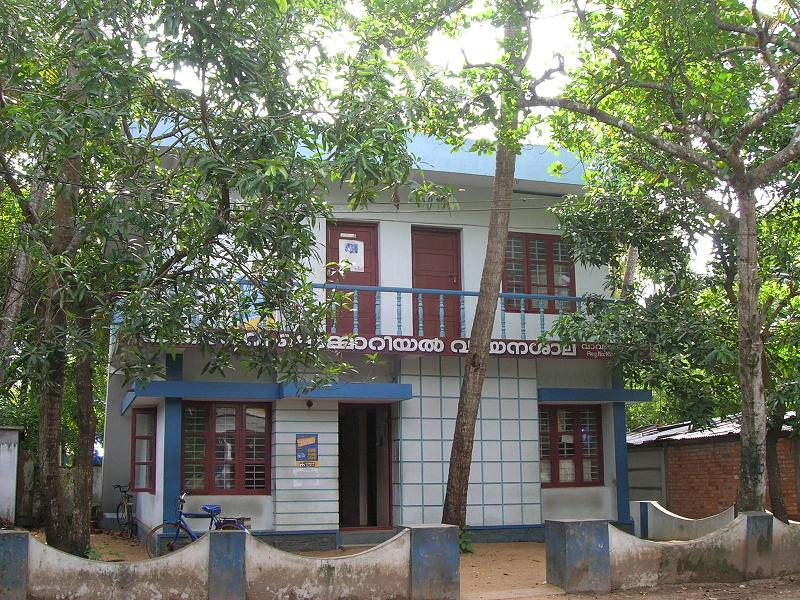
Gurudeva Library

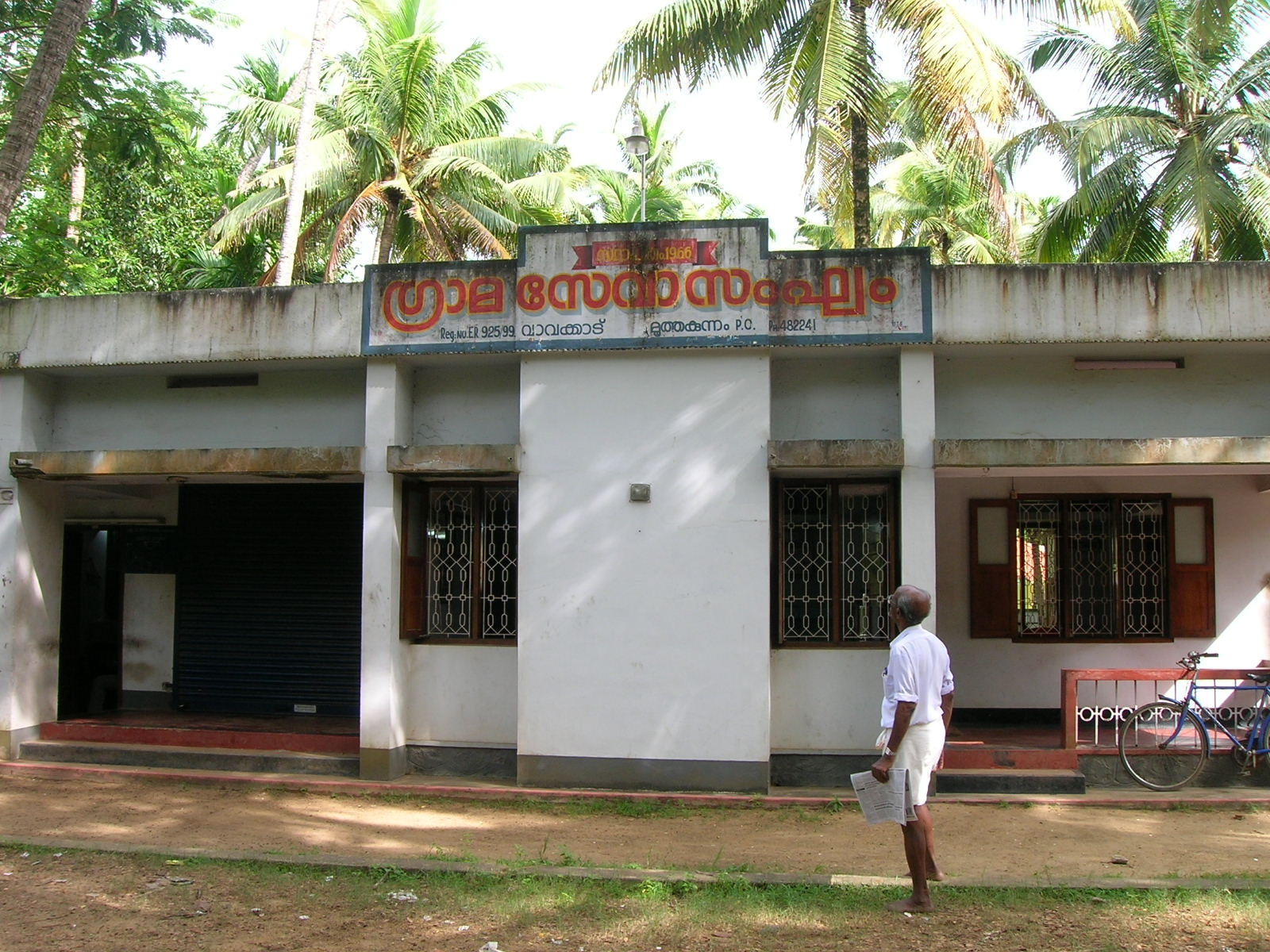
Village NPO

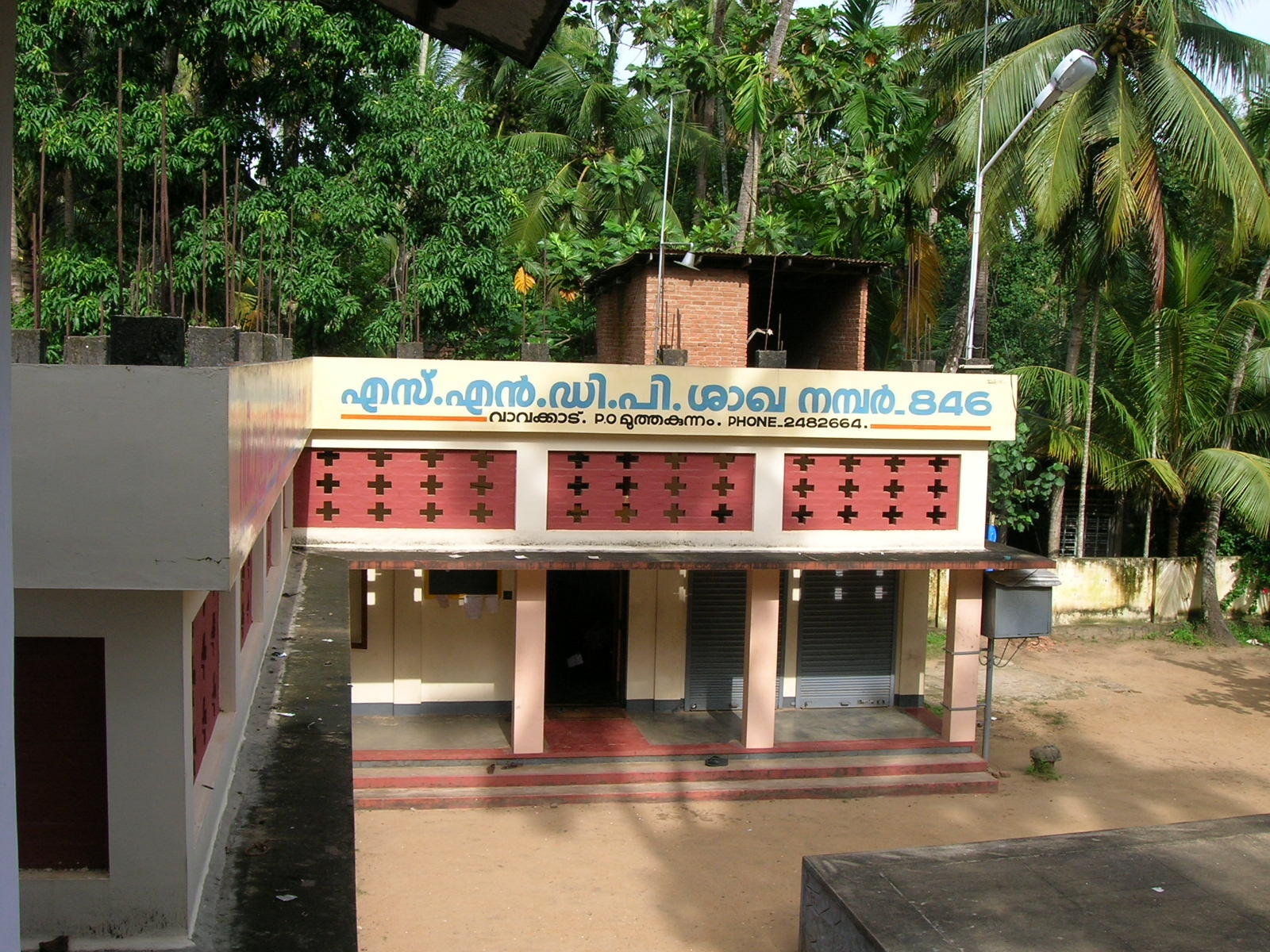
SNDP office

Vavakkad is a village situated along the northern border of Ernakulam District, Paravur taluk, Kerala, South India.

== Location ==
Vavakkad is located 27 km from the city of Ernakulam and 23 km from Cochin International airport, Nedumbassery. National Highway No 66 passes within 1.5 km of the village. Famous Cherai Beach is just 4 km away.

== History ==
The town's name derives from "Vaval Kadu" (literally, "forest of bats"). It was part of Thiruvithamkoor (Travancore) province before the reunion of states.

Vavakkad was the first village in Kerala to give a monthly pension to senior citizens above 70 years of age. Once famous for the production of coir, this industry is now in decline.

== Library ==
Gurudeva Memorial library and its surrounding ground is the center of cultural activities in Vavakkad. People meet there regularly to debate public issues. The library was founded in 1954 and named after Sree Narayana Guru, who is considered to be the father of cultural reform in Kerala.

== Public figures ==
Paravoor Bharathan, a popular comedian in the Malayalam film industry, who expired in 2015 is from here. There are more than 300 films to his credit.

== Political representatives ==
Name of representative	Body	Division	Position if any
Hibi Eden	Lok Sabha (House of the People)	Eranakulam	
V D Satheesan	Kerala Legislative Assembly	Paravoor	Chief Minister
M A Nithya Teacher	Ernakulam District Panchayath,	Moothakunnam	
Akhil Bavachan	Paravoor Block Panchayath	Moothakunnam	
Mini Rajappan	Vadakkekkara Grama Panchayath	Vavakkad East	
Sindhu Manoj	Vadakkekkara Grama Panchayath	Vavakkad	
