= Narsai Toma =

20th and 21st-century Iraqi bishop

Mar Narsai Toma
- Church: Ancient Church of the East
- Diocese: Archdiocese of Kirkuk

Orders
- Ordination: 5 December 1969 (as Metropolitan)
- Rank: Metropolitan

Personal details
- Born: Toma Soro Bobo; 1938 Mosul, Iraq
- Died: 28 August 2014 (aged 76) Kirkuk, Iraq

Mar Narsai Toma was the late Metropolitan of the Ancient Church of the East of the diocese of Kirkuk, Iraq. Mar Narsai served as Metropolitan for forty-six years before his death in 2014.

== Early life ==
Mar Narsai Toma was born as Toma Soro Bobo in Mosul, Iraq. He studied at the Church of the East School in Nineveh (Mosul) under the tutelage of Yousip DeKelaita. He studied both church history and the Aramaic language.

== Service to the Church ==
Toma was ordained as a deacon at a young age in 1956. Not long after the arrival of Mar Thoma Darmo to Baghdad, Iraq in September 1968, Toma was elevated to the rank of priest and assigned as a parish priest in Basra, Iraq. After the death of Mar Thoma Darmo in September 1969, Mar Narsai, alongside Mar Toma Gewargis, were elected to be ordained as metropolitans in the Ancient Church of the East. Both ordinations were conducted on 5 December 1969 by Mar Addai II, the Metropolitan of Iraq and Locum tenens of the Ancient Church of the East at the time.

Mar Narsai, together with Metropolitan of Nineveh, Mar Toma Giwargis, consecrated Mar Addai II as Catholicos-Patriarch of the Ancient Church of the East. The ordination took place on February 20, 1972, in Baghdad, Iraq.

During his tenure, Mar Narsai placed an emphasis on education. He was committed to the advancement of the Assyrian people through education. As a result, dozens of students were taught under his supervision as Metropolitan.

=== Death ===
Mar Narsai Toma died unexpectedly, in the late hours of August 28, 2014 in the city of Kirkuk, Iraq. Though it has been determined that he died of natural causes, it was known that he was managing several medical conditions for several years prior to his death. On August 31, 2014, the Sunday following his death, commemorative services were held in every parish under the Ancient Church of the East in his honor.

=== Legacy ===
Mar Gewargis Younan, Bishop of Chicago, released a statement following the Metropolitan's passing in which he wrote, "Mar Narsai held an integrity and decency that spoke louder than words. The Ancient Church of the East is proud to be associated with his name, and it is an honor for us to carry on his legacy."
