= Yohannan Yoseph =

Assyrian Church bishop b. 1966

His Grace Mar Yohannan Yoseph
- Episcopa of the Chaldean Syrian Church
- Church: Chaldean Syrian Church
- Archdiocese: India
- Province: Assyrian Church of the East
- Appointed: 17 January 2010

Orders
- Ordination: 11 April 1999 by Aprem Mooken
- Consecration: 17 January 2010 by Mar Dinkha IV

Personal details
- Born: Joju Anto; 14 November 1966 (age 59) Thrissur, Kerala, India
- Denomination: Christianity (Assyrian Church of the East)
- Parents: Therattil Chirakkekaran Antony and Annah (Cicily)
- Education: B.Com; B.D.; M.A.; PhD (Syriac Language & Literature)
- Alma mater: University of Calicut; University of Serampore; Mahatma Gandhi University

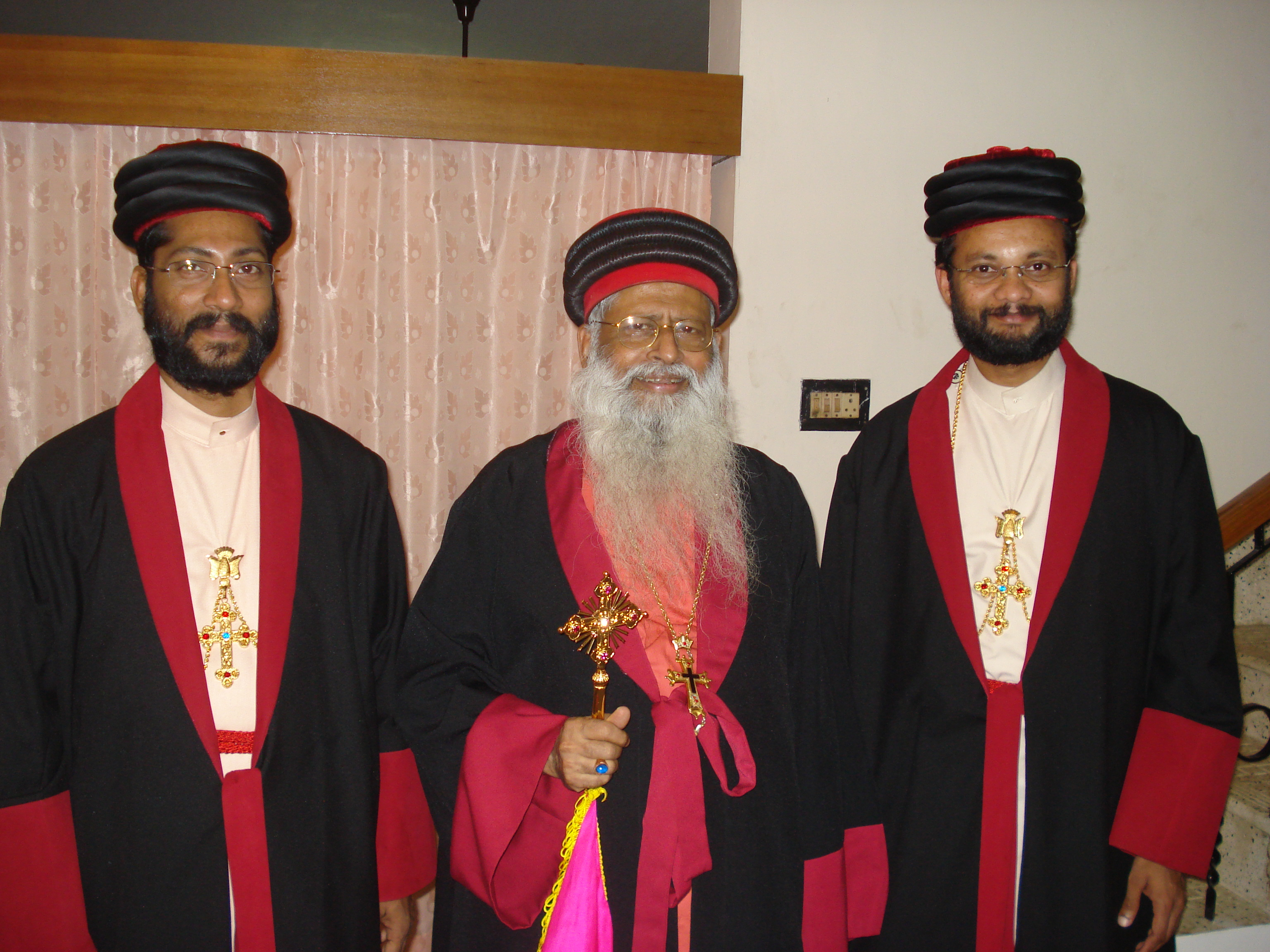
Aprem Mooken, with his two bishops, Yohannan Yoseph (left) and Awgin Kuriakose (right)

Mar Yohannan Yoseph (born 14 November 1966, in Trichur, India) is a bishop of the Chaldean Syrian Church, a metropolitan province of Assyrian Church of the East in India. He was consecrated on 17 January 2010, by Mar Dinkha IV, Patriarch of the Assyrian Church of the East.

== Early life ==
Mar Yohannan Yoseph was born Joju Anto at East Fort in Trichur on 14 November 1966. He is the seventh of nine children of Therattil Chirakkekaran Antony and Annah (Cicily teacher).

Joju Anto completed his schooling from Chaldean Syrian Primary School and Model High School for Boys, Trichur.

He earned his Bachelor of Commerce (B.Com) from Calicut University in 1989.

He studied Theology at Mar Thoma Theological Seminary, Kottayam (1990 - 1994), and earned a Bachelor of Divinity (B.D.) from the University of Serampore.

He stayed at St. Ephrem Ecumenical Research Institute, Kottayam (1998-2000), and earned a Master of Arts (M.A.) in Syriac Language and Literature from Mahatma Gandhi University, Kottayam in 2000. He then traveled to Iraq and stayed there till March, 2003 to continue Syriac studies.

He received his Doctorate (Phd Studies) in Syriac Language and Literature from Mahatma Gandhi University, Kottayam Kerala in 2017.

== Career ==
On 16 April 1989 Late Poulose Mar Poulose Episcopa ordained him as Deacon at Mar Adhai Sleeha Church, Paravattani.

On 11 April 1999 Mar Aprem Metropolitan (Aprem Mooken) ordained him as a priest at Mar Yohannan Mamdhana Church, East Fort, Thrissur. From 1996 to 1998 he served as Secretary to Mar Aprem Metropolitan(Aprem Mooken) and Poulose Mar Poulose Episcopa.

He served as the assistant vicar in multiple parishes:

- Mar Narsai Church Kachery
- St. Thomas Church Ernakulam
- Mar Qardagh Sahdha Church Chennai
- Mar Sleeva Church Cochin
- Mart Mariyam Church Koratty
- Mar Timotheus Church Calicut
- Mar Beesho Church Puthoor,
- Mar Adhai Sleeha Church Paravattani
- Mar Oudisho Church Baghdad.

He took the initiative to construct Mar Abdisho Church at Kottayam that later became a Parish while he was vicar. He served as the president of Mar Thoma Ashram (Orphanage for Boys) at Mulayam.

On 17 January 2010 he was consecrated as Episcopa of the Holy Catholic Assyrian Church of the East for the Archdiocese of India by Mar Dinkha IV.
