= Abimalek Timotheus =

Assyrian priest of the Church of the East

Saint Mar Abimalek Timotheus
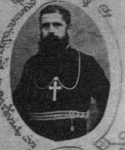

Metropolitan of Malabar and All India
- Born: 28 August 1878; Mar Bisho, Ottoman Empire
- Died: 30 April 1945; Trichur, Cochin, British Raj
- Venerated in: Church of the East
- Canonized: 29 September 2019, Thrissur by Catholicos-Patriarch Gewargis III
- Feast: 1 May

Ordination history of Mar Abimalek Timotheus
History
Diaconal ordination
- Ordained by: Mar Shimun XIX
- Date: 7 July 1903
Priestly ordination
- Ordained by: Mar Shimun XIX
- Date: 21 September 1903
Episcopal consecration
- Principal consecrator: Mar Shimun XIX
- Co-consecrators: Mar Yalda Yahballaha
- Date: 15 December 1907
- Place: Patriarchal Cathedral of Mar Shalita, Qochanis, Ottoman Empire

Mar Abimalek Timotheus (28 August 1878 – 30 April 1945) was a cleric of the Church of the East who served as Metropolitan of Malabar and All India from 1907 until his death in 1945. Born in the village of Mar Bisho in the Ottoman Empire, he was sent to India by Catholicos-Patriarch Shimun XIX after Shimun received a petition to appoint a bishop from the Chaldean Syrian Church in Trichur (now Thrissur).

The Holy Synod of the Assyrian Church of the East announced that Timotheus would be canonised in May 2018 following the adoption of a new procedure for canonisation, and his sainthood was formally proclaimed by Catholicos-Patriarch Gewargis III on 29 September 2019.

Church of the East titles
Vacant Title last held by Abdisho Thondanatta	Metropolitan of Malabar and All India; 1907–1945	Vacant Title next held by Thoma Darmo
