= Pazhayakoottukar =

Historical East Syriac Saint Thomas Christian faction

The Paḻayakūṟ (Pazhayakoor; Malayalam: പഴയകൂർ; English: "Old Allegiance"), also known as Malabar Chaldeans, Syrian Catholics of Malabar, Chaldean Syrians, Romo-Syrians or Syro-Malabarese, are the Saint Thomas Christians who use the East Syriac Rite and claim apostolic origin from the Indian mission of Thomas the Apostle in the 1st century AD.

The Saint Thomas Christians were originally in full communion with the Church of the East in Persia, from whom they inherited the East Syriac liturgical rite. Through the Schism of 1552, a faction of the Church of the East entered the Catholic Church. Following the 1599 Synod of Diamper, they were placed under the Latin Church's Padroado missionaries, who took over the jurisdiction of Angamaly. (Note: "In the travelogue Varthamanappusthakam (dated to 1790) written by Paremmakkal Thoma Kathanar, the author uses the terms Malankara Pallikkar, Malankara Idavaka, Malankara Sabha etc. to refer the Syrian Catholic community. In modern day ecclesiastic language “Malankara” denote the West Syriac rite of the “Malankra Orthodox”, “Malankara Jacobite”, “Malankara Mar Thoma” and “Syro Malankra”. The “ Malabar” denote the East Syriac rite of the “ Syro Malabar Church”.) After the Coonan Cross Oath of 1653, which constituted a secession from the Padroado, the Paḻayakūṟ quickly returned to the Catholic Church as East Syriac Catholics under Archbishop Palliveettil Chandy.

Chandy's followers eventually became the Syro-Malabar Church, an Eastern Catholic Church in full communion with the Holy See. Another group within the Paḻayakūṟ returned to the traditions of the Church of the East and became the Chaldean Syrian Church, now part of the Assyrian Church of the East.

== Origin ==
=== Early history of Christianity in India ===
Traditionally, Thomas the Apostle is credited for the establishment of Christianity in India. He is believed to have come to Muziris on the Malabar coast, which is in Kerala, in AD 52.

The Jewish community in India are known to have existed in Kerala in the 1st century AD, and it was possible for an Aramaic-speaking Jew, such as St. Thomas from Galilee, to make a trip to Kerala then. The earliest known source connecting the Apostle to India is the Acts of Thomas, likely written in the early 3rd century, perhaps in Edessa. The tradition of origin of the Christians in Kerala is found in a version of the Songs of Thomas or Thomma Parvam, in which, Thomas is described as arriving in or around Maliankara and founding Seven Churches, or Ezharapallikal: Kodungallur, Kottakavu, Palayoor, Kokkamangalam, Nilackal, Niranam and Kollam. Some other churches, namely Thiruvithamcode Arappally (a "half church"), Malayattoor and Aruvithura are often called Arappallikal. The Thomma Parvam further narrates St Thomas's mission in the rest of South India and his martyrdom at Mylapore in present-day Chennai, Tamil Nadu.

=== Church of the East in India ===
An organized Christian presence in India dates to the arrival of East Syriac settlers and missionaries from Persia, members of what would become the Church of the East, in around the 3rd century. Saint Thomas Christians trace the further growth of their community to the arrival of Jewish-Christians from the region of Mesopotamia led by Knāi Thoma, which is said to have occurred in 345. However, most experts believe that the arrival of Knai Thoma must have occurred in the ninth century. The subgroup of the Saint Thomas Christians known as the Knanaya or Southists trace their lineage to Thomas of Cana, while the group known as the Northists claim descent from the early Christians evangelized by Thomas the Apostle. Byzantine traveller Cosmas Indicopleustes wrote of Syrian Christians he met in India and Sri Lanka in the 6th century.

Even in Taprobané [Sri Lanka], an island in Further India, where the Indian sea is, there is a Church of Christians, with clergy and a body of believers, but I know not whether there be any Christians in the parts beyond it. In the country. called Malé [Malabar],' where the pepper grows, there is also a church, and at another place called Calliana there is moreover a bishop, who is appointed from Persia.

Until the seventh century, the Saint Thomas Christians were included in the Metropolitanate of Persia. The metropolitan of Rev Ardashir, the head of the province, used to consecrated bishops for the Diocese of India. Patriarch Ishoyahb III (650-660) criticises Shemʿon, metropolitan of Rev Ardashir:

"As far as your province is concerned, from the time you showed recalcitrance against ecclesiastical canons, the episcopal succession has been interrupted in India, and this country has since sat in darkness, far from the light of divine teaching by means of rightful bishops: not only India that extends from the borders of the Persian empire, to the country which is called Kaleh, which is a distance of one thousand and two hundred parasangs, but even your own Persia."

The port at Kollam, then known as Quilon, was founded in 825 by Maruvān Sapir Iso, a Persian Christian merchant, with sanction from Ayyanadikal Thiruvadikal, the king of the independent Venad or the State of Quilon, a feudatory under Sthanu Ravi Varma Perumal of the Chera kingdom. Sapir Iso was the East Syriac Christian merchant who led the East Syriac bishops Mar Sabor and Mar Proth to the Christians of Malabar. The two bishops were instrumental in founding many Christian churches with Syrian liturgy along the Malabar coast and were venerated as Qandishangal (saints) since then by the Thomas Christians. It was during this period that Christians disappeared from the Coromandel Coast.

=== Chaldean metropolitans and the Portuguese ===
Following the schism of 1552 in the Church of the East, when Monk Yohannan Sulaqa and his followers joined the Catholic Church, forming the Chaldean Catholic Church, both the traditional and the Chaldean Catholic factions sent bishops to India. The first of the Chaldean Catholic bishops in India was Yawsep Sulaqa, the brother of Yohannan Sulaqa. Another bishop, Abraham, arrived in India as a traditionalist bishop but later joined the Catholic faction.

== Synod of Diamper and Coonan Cross Oath ==
Abraham was to become the last Chaldean bishop to govern the undivided Saint Thomas Christian community. Following his death in 1597, the Portuguese missionaries, who had arrived along with the colonial traders to India, started a vigorous and comprehensive process of Latinisation in liturgy and discipline among the local Christians and prevented other East Syriac bishops from reaching Malabar. These efforts culminated in the so-called Synod of Diamper (1599), the local clergy was forced to reject the Chaldean Catholic patriarch of Babylon, who in fact was in full communion with Rome at that time, as a Nestorian heretic and schismatic. The Portuguese, who controlled the maritime routes to India at that time, continued to block the arrival of eastern bishops. They occupied the diocesan administration of the Saint Thomas Christians and deprived the archdeacon of his traditional rights. The wait of Syrian Christians for a Syrian bishop to restore their past ecclesiastical dignity and autonomy seemingly came to an end in the arrival of Ahattalla, a West Syriac bishop. But the Portuguese prevented Ahattalla from entering Malabar, despite the prayers of Archdeacon Thoma Parambil and the local Christians in 1653. This provoked a strong reaction from the local Christians, led by the archdeacon, in the form of the Coonan Cross Oath. Although the exact wording of the oath is disputed, its effect was the severing of the relationship between the local Christians and the Portuguese and the proclamation of the archdeacon as their new metropolitan with the title 'Mar Thoma'.

== Schism ==
Following the Synod of Diamper held in 1599 and organised by Aleixo de Menezes, the Primate of East Indies and Archbishop of Goa, many traditions and numerous Syriac books of the native Saint Thomas Christians were condemned. Although the Synod proposed a highly Latinised form of liturgy, it was resisted by most of them. Francisco Ros, the Latin Jesuit bishop who was appointed to the now downgraded bishopric of Angamaly, openly renounced the Synod of Diamper and called for a new synod at Angamaly to substitute it. This second Synod of Angamaly implemented a Latinised form of the Chaldean Rite among the Saint Thomas Christians. Being, a highly skilled Syriacist, this new Syriac liturgy was introduced by Roz himself. The text of the new liturgy largely consisted of translations from the Latin and intended to re-place the original East Syriac (Chaldean) rite of the local Christians.

=== Reunion with Rome ===
In 1656, Pope sent an Italian 'Disclaced' Carmelite priest named Giuseppe Maria Sebastiani with the aim of bringing back the Saint Thomas Christians who had separated themselves from the jurisdiction of the existing Catholic bishop through the Coonan Cross Oath. In 1659, Sebastiani was appointed as Apostolic vicar of Malabar with the faculty of appointing a new bishop from the native Christians replacing the Portuguese bishop. He consecrated Chandy Parambil as the local bishop in 1663, after the Dutch, having defeated the Portuguese, banned other Europeans from operating in Malabar.

=== Liturgical change and schism ===
With the presence of another local and validly appointed bishop, Thoma's authority increasingly began to be questioned and people abandoned him. With this, Thomas wrote letters seeking help from non-Eastern churches. In response, a Syriac Orthodox bishop named Gregorios Abdal Jalīl arrived in Malabar in 1665 and regularised Thoma's episcopacy. Succeeding Thoma, senior priests in his Pakalōmaṯṯam dynastic line took over as the leaders of the faction that remained aligned to him. They too maintained strong relations with the Syriac Orthodox Church. Over time, they adopted the West Syriac Rite instead of the old East Syriac Rite. Thus the split in the Saint Thomas Christian community solidified and those who descend from Thoma's faction came to be called Puthankoottukar (Puttankūṯṯukāṟ or 'those of the new allegiance') and those of Chandy came to be called Pazhayakoottukar (Paḻayakūṯṯukāṟ or 'those of the old allegiance').

The Puthankoottukar gradually shifted to West Syriac Rite and Miaphysitism. However, the majority among the Pazhayakoottukar also resisted the latinisation and a long struggle began for maintaining the Chaldaean rite and the contact with both the patriarchates of the Church of the East while identifying themselves Catholic in communion with the Holy See of Rome.

== Propaganda rule ==
Bishop Palliveettil Chandy tried to consecrate Thoma II, the leader of the Puthenkoor, as his successor, in an attempt to reunify both the Puthenkoor and the Pazhayakoor under a common Catholic hierarchy. However, this attempt was spoiled by the missionaries. Meanwhile, the missionaries assured Chandy that his successor will be a native. Hence, Chandy held his archdeacon as his rightful successor. But after Chandy's death, the missionaries appointed a half-Indian Portuguese, Raphael Figueredo (c. d. 1695) as the Vicar Apostolic of Malabar for Saint Thomas Christians. This appointment shook the confidence they had in the propaganda Carmelites and quarrels started to escalate. Many churches protested against the move and some even joined Thoma II. Soon, Bishop Raphael Figueredo also lost the favour of the Carmelites and he was replaced with Custodius de Pinho (c. d. 1697) as the Vicar Apostolic of Malabar. Chandy died in 1687 and with him the initial attempts for reunification of both factions also died out.

== East Syriac attempts to Reunion ==
=== Metropolitan Shemʿon and his mission in Malabar ===
During this time, Metropolitan Shemʿon of ʿAda (d. c. 1720) arrived in India. He was originally sent by Patriarch Eliah IX Yohannan Augen of the 'Eliah' Patriarchate of the Church of the East and was previously his representative in Rome to discuss Church union. He travelled to India in a Portuguese ship and reached Goa. However he was arrested and deported. Later he approached the 'Josephite' Patriarchate and made a Catholic profession of faith. He was consequently appointed as Metropolitan by Patriarch Joseph II for the faithful in India. He travelled to India once again and reached Surat. There, he was detained in a Capuchin monastery. He informed that he was a Catholic bishop sent from the Chaldean Patriarch. Moreover, during the same time the Rome wanted to curtail the Padroado authority in India, through the propaganda administration. Rome had appointed Angelo Francisco Vigliotti, a Carmelite missionary, to be the future bishop of Verapoly. This plan would enable Rome to surpass the Padroado administration in India. Fearing about these plans and reluctant to share authority, the Padroado declined the request to consecrate the newly appointed bishop-elect. Therefore, the missionaries accepted Shemʿon's Catholic faith just in order to make him consecrate the Carmelite bishop. On 22 May 1701, Shemʿon was escorted to Alangad, where he was made to consecrate Angelo Francisco at midnight. The Carmelites took every precaution so that he could not meet anyone from the Saint Thomas Christians. He was then secretly deported to Pondicherry. There he lived in home custody until his death on 16 August 1720. Although all these happened in utmost secrecy, a letter that he sent from the Capuchin monastery of Surat to the Saint Thomas Christians, was preserved and his memory was cherished by them. Shemʿon's dead body was found in a well near where he was detained in Pondicherry and thus the Saint Thomas Christians believed that he was murdered by the missionaries. His tragedy inspired them and he was hailed as a martyr for the efforts to maintain the Church of the East's jurisdiction and East Syriac Rite among them.

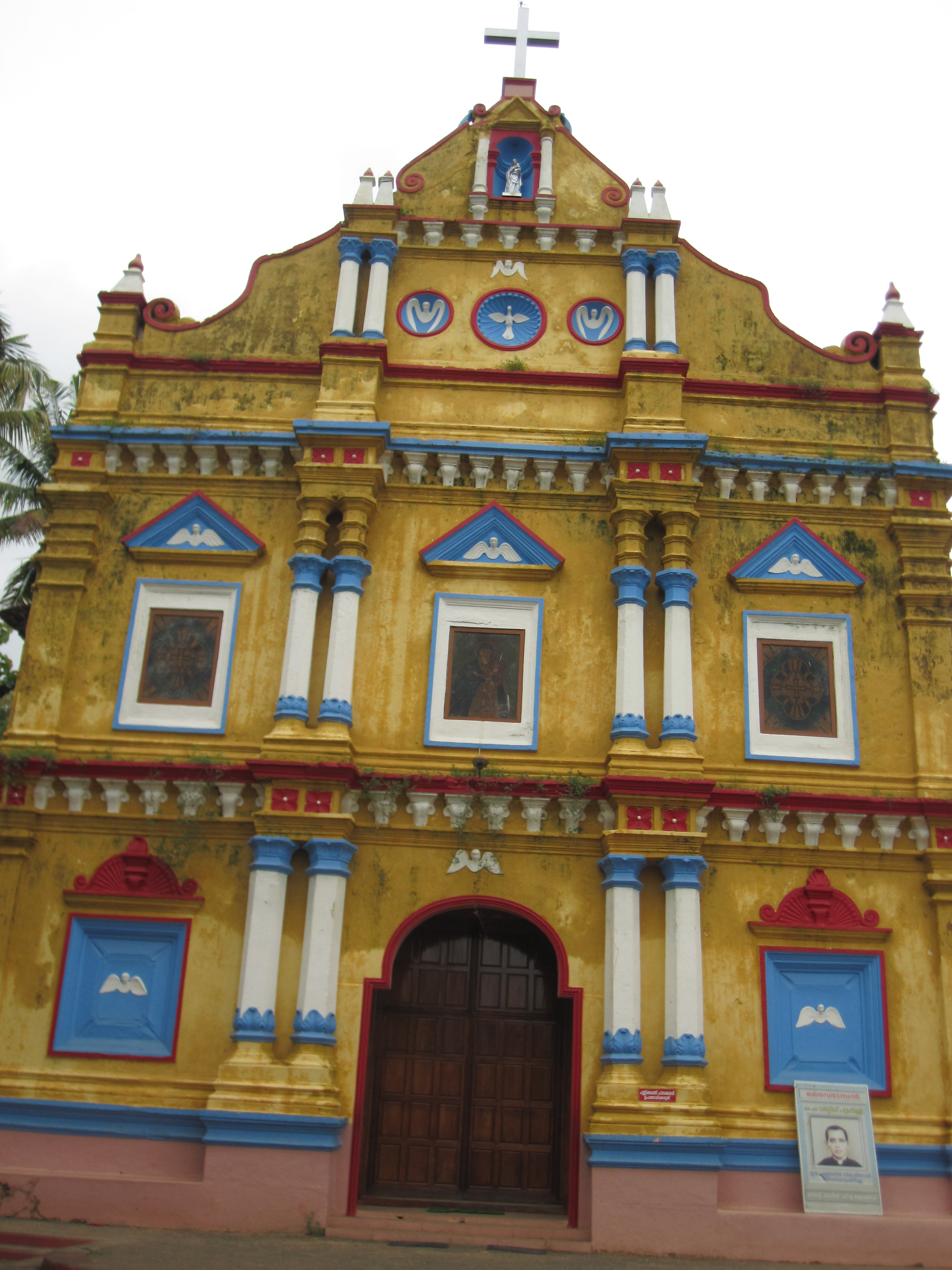
St. Mary's Syro-Malabar Church, Alangad

An excerpt from the letter of Metropolitan Shemʿon addressed to the Saint Thomas Christians in MS Mannanam Mal 14, 46r-45v folios:

After praying that you be in spiritual peace and enquiring about your condition I let it know to your graceful love that I came from Mar Eliah, Patriarch of the East; let his glorious see be fortified! Amen. First I went to Jerusalem and from there I went to the great Rome and to Spain and to the land of Portugal; from there I came to the land of India, to the city of Anjuna and asked about you and he [whom I asked] told me: “Those people are not here, the people whom you seek, but go to the city of Surat, there you will find them.” I went to Surat and did not see anybody from among you, but I saw a Jew and a book [letter] of yours was with him. I took it from him, kissed it and read, rejoiced very much and asked him: “Where would be these Christians?” - and he told me: “In the land of Kochi.”.....

=== Metropolitan Gabriel and his temporary success ===
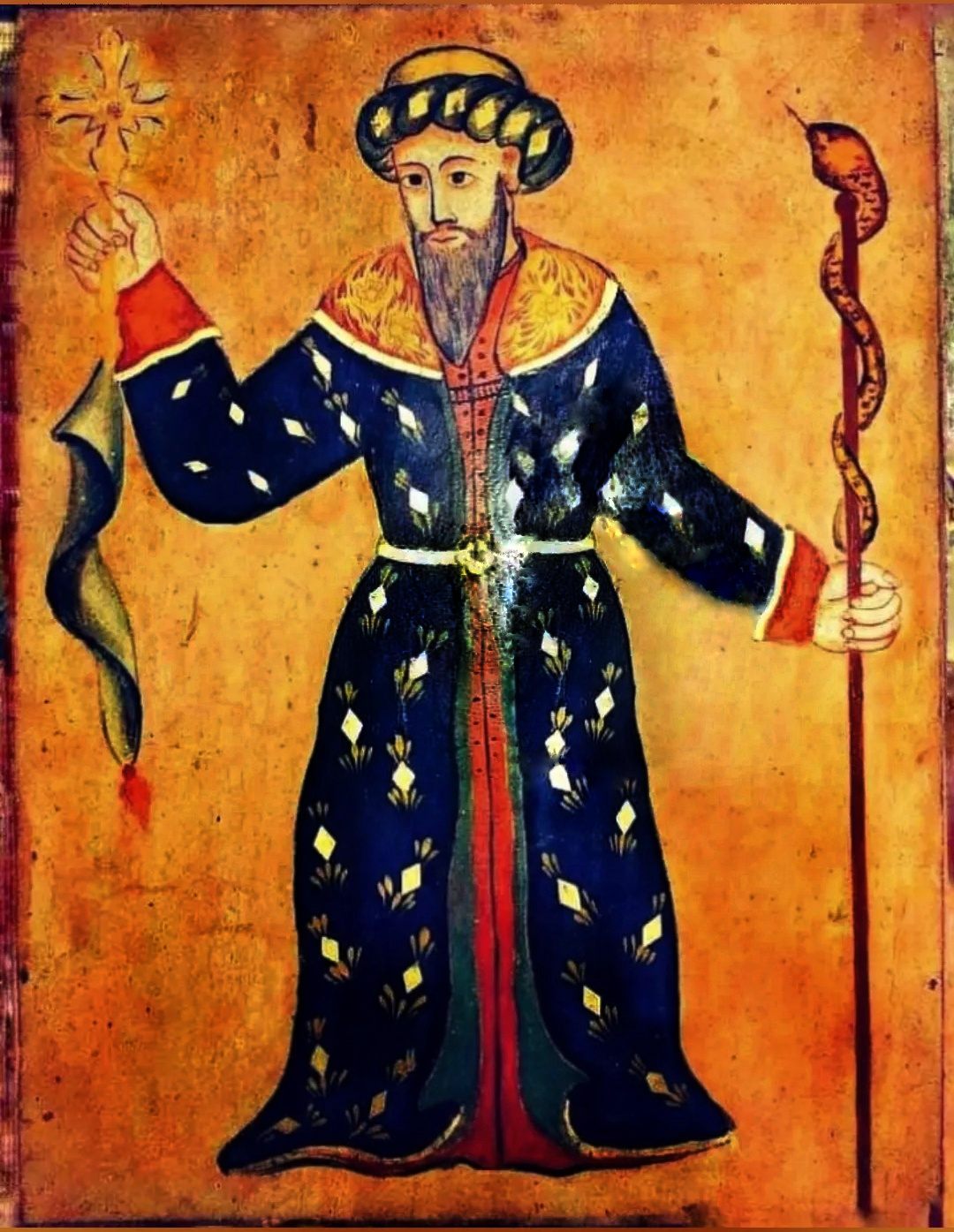

By 1705, another East Syrian bishop was working in Southern Malabar, sent by the Catholicos of the East, Patriarch Eliah X Augen. His mission was roughly coterminous with that of Shemʿon of ʿAda, however much more fruitful. He was Gabriel of Ardishai, the Metropolitan of Azerbaijan. Unlike Metropolitan Shem˓on, Gabriel neither explicitly claim to be Chaldean Catholic bishop nor was he interested in a friendship with the Latin missionaries. However, he implicitly presented himself as a Catholic bishop sent from the Chaldean Patriarchate. Previously he was in Rome and he had interactions with the Propaganda in an aim to get approval as the bishop for Saint Thomas Christians. In 1704, he wrote profession faith to be examined. However it was rejected by the Propaganda as they found it unsound to Catholic doctrine. He was asked to make necessary corrections, which he did not and without getting Rome's approval, he made his journey to Malabar.

However, in one of his two letters preserved in the Saint Joseph's Monastery at Mannanam, dated 1708, he makes a perfect Catholic confession of "the Lady Mary the Mother of God and Ever virgin Mary" and sent it to Angelo Francisco. Gabriel then declares that he is the “Metropolitan of all India of the Syrians”. The second letter is written in 1712 and is entitled "Letter of Gabriel Metropolitan of all India". In it, Gabriel answers an inquiry from the Paḻayakūṟ faithful concerning his faith: “If you ask me about my faith, my faith is like the faith of the holy Lord Pope”.

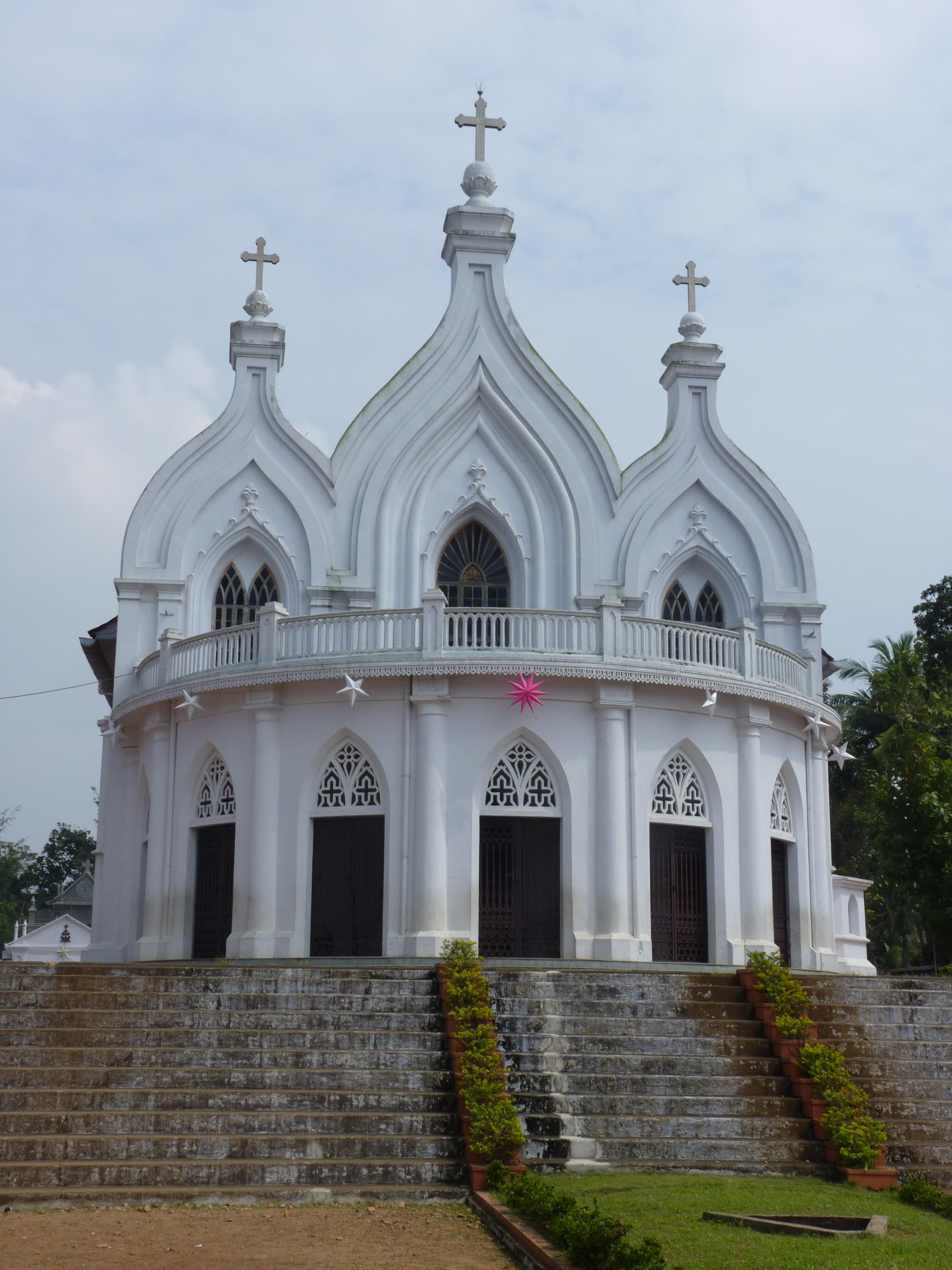
Changanassery church

Meanwhile, Giuseppe Sagribanti, Prefect of the Propaganda and writing in the name of Pope Innocent XIII, rejects his claims by saying that Gabriel has no authority from the Pope. In 1712, the Propaganda sent him another letter, ordering him to retreat from Malabar to his flock in Azerbaijan. Meanwhile, Gabriel ignored the letters of the Propaganda and instead of making a new confession of faith to be sent to Rome, he made the aforementioned confession of faith in a letter addressed to Angelo Francisco in order to make peace with him and with the Carmelites residing in Malabar. Gabriel was then residing near the church in Changanassery. In the letter, it is also declared among other things that Gabriel was celebrating the Eucharist with unleavened bread. However, it is clear that he used both leavened and unleavened bread opportunistically. Meanwhile, Angelo Francisco received the letter of Giuseppe Sagribanti that alerted the Carmelites. They were successful in persuading the natives and thereby ousting Gabriel from the Changanassery. Gabriel then found residence in Kottayam Minor church. This church was then used by both factions of Saint Thomas Christians. Individuals and families belonging to both factions had close relationships and the allegiance to the faction to which one belonged often owed more to local reasons than to faith. Opposition and rivalries was more personal than theological.

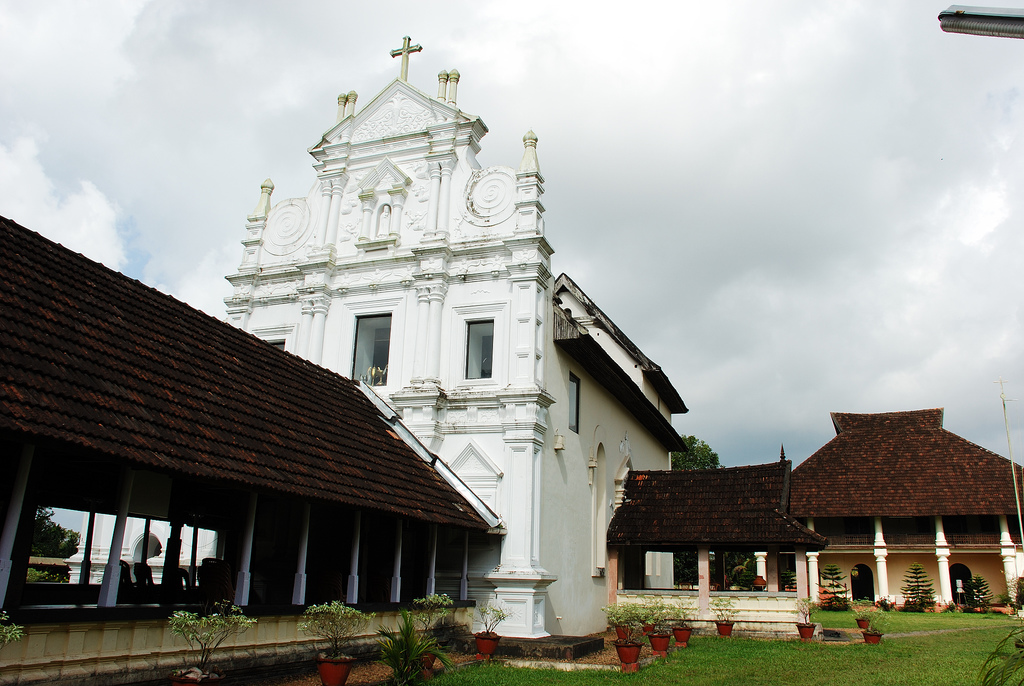
Kottayam Minor Church

During this period, the leader of the Puthenkur was Thoma IV (c. d. 1728). Gabriel opposed him and was successful in winning back a number of churches and faithful from his faction. Many churches from the Paḻayakūṟ also joined him. He claimed to have secured about 44 churches in his leadership. Thoma IV was by this time a supporter of Miaphysitism, brought by the Syriac Orthodox prelates, and he regarded Gabriel as a Nestorian heretic. In 1709, he wrote a letter to the Syriac Orthodox Patriarch, pleading that bishops be sent to aid him in countering Gabriel's arguments.

Gabriel strongly opposed the Portuguese but sought the support of the Dutch. His letter to Jacobus Canter Visscher, a Dutch chaplain at Kochi, gives an apologetic detail of the history of Christianity in India and expresses staunch opposition to the Portuguese missionaries. Following is an excerpt from the letter, entitled "The antiquity of the Syrian Christians, and Historical events relating to them", addressed to Visscher:

And in the days of this persecution, the upright, God-fearing, justice-loving, and peaceable Dutch were sent to Malabar by the inspiration of Almighty God and by order of the East India Company, under the command of the noble Lord Admiral Ryklop van Goens, and like as the heathen were driven out of the land of Isso Biranon Kinan [Canaan] so have they driven the worse than heathen Portuguese out of Cochin and other cities and fortresses of Malabar; and through Divine Providence the Syrian christians have been from that time forward protected and defended from them, and their pastors have again visited this country without let or hindrance.

Gabriel received certain amount of support and favour from the Dutch and he remained in India until his death in 1731. Visscher gives the following account of Metropolitan Gabriel:

Mar Gabriel, a white man, and sent hither from Bagdad, is aged and venerable in appearance, and dresses nearly in the same fashion as the Jewish priests of old, wearing a cap fashioned like a turban, and a long white beard. He is courteous and God-fearing, and not at all addicted to extravagant pomp. Round his neck he wears a golden crucifix. He lives with the utmost sobriety, abstaining from all animal food ... He holds the Nestorian doctrine respecting the union of the two natures in our Saviour's person.

Under the protection of the Dutch, he was able to mount a strong resistance against the Carmelite missionaries and also Thoma IV, the Syriac-Orthodox-leaning Puthenkoor leader, until his death. However he failed to establish a continuous line of succession in India and his followers had to return to their previous allegiances after his death.

== Indigenous attempts for reunification ==
Following the arrival of West Syriac prelates in 1751, Thoma VI, the leader of the Puthenkūr was troubled by their increasing influence among his faction. Therefore, in order to reunite his faction with the Paḻayakūṟ and thus to prevent the West Syriac prelates, he initiated efforts to submit to the Pope and profess the Catholic creed. However, the Carmelite missionaries working among the Pazhayakūr were reluctant to reciprocate to his efforts fearing that the indigenous bishop would take away their authority and influence over the faction after the proposed reunification of the Saint Thomas Christians was fulfilled. Baselios Shakrallah Qasabgi, the head of the Syriac Orthodox delegation, consecrated Kurian Kattumangat as Bishop Abraham Koorilose in 1764. These West Syriac bishops were skeptical about the validity of Sacraments administered by Thoma VI. They often re-ordained priests who were already ordained by him. Very often they appointed their own candidates as priests without even consulting the native bishop. They were in a process of replacing the Latinised East Syriac Rite and traditions of the Putthenkūṟ with a separate West Syriac identity. They insisted on removing from the churches of Putthenkur crucifixes and statues of saints and Mary, which were kept and venerated in these churches ever since the onset of Portuguese influence among them. This led to frequent conflicts between the adherents of new rite and those following the old. This led to eventual division of churches between Paḻayakūṟ and the Putthenkūṟ fractions of the St.Thomas Christians. By 1770, the prelates forced Thoma VI to be reconsecrated as 'Dionysios I'. Thoma VI had to receive all orders of priesthood from the tonsure to the episcopal consecration. Thoma VI received support from Pazhayakūr leaders, who informed him of the ill-treatment and discrimination that they faced from the missionaries. In 1773, the leaders and representatives of the Paḻayakūṟ community assembled at the Great church in Angamāly to discuss the church union. This general meeting at Angamaly was dominated by strong emotions against the colonial religious missionaries and the Padroado and Propaganda bishops working then in Kerala. The representatives from the Edappally church narrated the way how the European missionaries put their parish priest to death.

On the feast-day of Theresa of Avila there was a 40 hours adoration at Verapoly. Puthenpurackal Jacob Kathanar, the parish priest of Edappilly church also went for the adoration and returned to his parish church along with other people. The European Carmelite missionaries forgot to lock the church after dinner and on the next day the gold monstrance was found to be missing. Suspecting Jacob Kathanar to be the thief he was taken by force to Verapoly by the missionaries and was denied food for several days. He fell ill and died. His last request before death for receiving Holy Communion too was denied. He was also denied a church burial, as his body was wrapped up in a mat and buried near a pond.

Consequently, they selected two priests: Kariattil Iousep and Paremmakkal Thoma to meet the Pope to convey the message of Thoma VI and to negotiate the union of the dissident Putthenkūṟ faction. They also decided to meet the Portuguese monarch, who was in charge of the Padroado Real. This movement was led by the instigation and the financial backing of a rich Christian merchant and the first Christian minister of the King of Travancore, Thachil Matthoo Tharakan. Other members of the community contributed by selling or pawning their jewellery and property. Kariattil was previously a student at the school of the Propaganda in Rome and had earned a doctoral degree there. Kariyattil Iousep, accompanied by Paremmakkal Thoma and two other deacons, made the trip from Kerala in 1778. Meanwhile, the Propaganda missionaries, who had already achieved the trust of the pope, managed to spoil the efforts at Rome. But, the Portuguese Queen, who was impressed with Kariyattil Iousep for his sincere effort and knowledge, decided to bestow the title of Archbishop of Cranganore upon him using her Padroado rights. He was thus consecrated as the Archbishop of Cranganore in 1782, effectively making him the Metropolitan of the united Malankara Church. However, Kariattil died in unclear circumstances in Goa. Thus the efforts drastically failed and planned Church reunion could not be realised. Following this, the Paḻayakūṟ was led by Thomas Paremmakkal who took charge as the administrator of the Archdiocese of Cranganore. The Padroado authorities in Goa and the Propaganda missionaries in Malabar recognised his authority in the fear of protest from the Paḻayakūṟ Christians. Following this in 1787, representatives from the eighty-four Pazhayakūr churches assembled at Angamaly and drew up the Angamāly Padiyōla against the colonial Latin hegemony, declaring their allegiance to the Paremmakkal Thoma and urged for the reinstatement of their native East Syriac hierarchy. Varthamanappusthakam, written by Thoma Kathanar in 1785, provides the detail of this journey until the death of the archbishop.

Thomas Paremmakkal, supported by Thachil Matthoo Tharakan, continued the negotiations with Dionysius I. In 1796, they sent a delegation to the Chaldean Catholic Patriarchate. The delegation was led by Paulose Pandari, a Paḻayakūṟ priest. They met Patriarch Yohannan VII Hormizd at the Monastery of Rabban Hormizd and requested him to send East Syriac bishops to India. The Patriarch consecrated Paulose Pandari as Metropolitan of Malabar under the episcopal name Mar Abraham and sent him to India. It was symbolic gesture from the Chaldean Patriarchate presenting the Metropolitan as the episcopal successor of Abraham, the last East Syriac Metropolitan of the undivided Church of the East in India. In 1799, Dionysius I paid obedience at the Thathampally Church in Alappuzha. However, Metropolitan Abraham Pandari soon became sick. According to the diary of Kuriakose Elias Chavara, he grew mad and thus proved to be unable to administer the Church. There were other attempts in 1799 to bring a new bishop to replace Pandari. However, none of those attempts materialised. Thus this short lived reunion failed.

An excerpt from the letter of Patriarch Yohannan VII Hormizd addressed to the faithful in Malabar gives a detail of the attempts for restoration of the East Syriac hierarchy.

After duly enquiring about your spiritual well-being and asking about your condition, we let it be known to your beloved kindness that from the day when we sent Priest Joseph and Priest Hormizd, there came to us no reply from you, until now. Now we have sent Reader Abdisho, who will go to your place of residence to find out about your condition and will come and let us know about your condition. He will let you know about our condition; he will let you know everything about our activity now that we are asking our Lord and are soliciting the abundant ocean of His mercy that He may bless you with all heavenly blessing and take away and make depart from you the sufferings and the affliction and that He may liberate you from the temptations and the rebellion and the evil scandals, by the prayer of the Apostles and the Fathers, so that during your lifetime you may remain healthy and be preserved in the sign of the living Cross of the Lord. Yes and Amen.

One of the reasons for weakening of their vigour was Thachil Matthu Tharakan's misfortune. Thachil Matthoo Tharakan was troubled by Veluthampy Dalava's rising influence in the royal court of Travancore. His properties were confiscated and he was imprisoned. Although the King later repented for the indiscriminate actions of the Dalava, the church union movement had already lost its powerful economic backing.

== Correspondence with the Chaldean Patriarchate ==
It was only in the 19th century that correspondence with the East Syriac patriarchate was revived. Protests against the Latin Carmelite missionaries were strong among the Pazhayakoottukar. The Carmelite missionaries who had taken over their administration were reluctant to admit the native Christians into their monastic order. The missionaries only allowed their membership in their third order, which had no rights of authority. In this situation, some priests interested in monasticism established independent monasteries. Anthony Kudakkachira, the founder of Pḻāṣanāl monastery, was among those monastic priests. When Bernardinos Beccinelli became the Vicar Apostolic of Verapoly, he halted ordinations of those training at Pḻāṣanāl and attempted to suppress the monastery altogether. As such activities became widespread, Kudakkachira stepped forward to take the lead in the local resistance. Denha bar Yona, a Chaldean priest sent by the patriarch to Malabar, inspired them to go to Baghdad and meet Chaldean patriarch Yawsep VI Audo. Consequently in 1852, a group of Syrians, led by Monk Anthony Kudakkachira, went to Baghdad to meet the patriarch and to request bishops to be appointed to the Chaldeans in Malabar. The patriarch gifted them a golden chalice and sent them back asking to collect signatures for their petition since Rome had strongly opposed the sending of Chaldean Catholic bishops to Malabar. Kudakkachira, having fulfilled the requirement, travelled towards Baghdad but died on his way and was buried in Baghdad. Anthony Thondanatt, one of the priests who had accompanied him, took up the cause, and met with the patriarch. Patriarch Yawsep VI, without waiting for permission from Rome, sent Metropolitan Thoma Rokkos as his representative to Malabar in 1861. Most Catholic Thomas Christians, overjoyed with the arrival of a Chaldean bishop, shifted their allegiance towards him. This compelled Bishop Beccinelli to appoint a Pazhayakoor priest, namely, Kuriakose Elias Chavara, as his Vicar general for the Syrian Chaldeans under his vicariate. Pope Pius IX issued an ultimatum to Yawsep VI to recall Rokkos from India or face excommunication. Meanwhile Chavara persuaded Rokkos to withdraw in 1862. The churches that had followed Rokkos were reluctant to submit to Beccinelli and hence many of these in the Kingdom of Cochin shifted to Padroado jurisdiction under the Archdiocese of Cranganore while those in Travancore had to return to the jurisdiction of Verapoly. Anthony Thondanatt followed Metropolitan Rokkos to Baghdad in 1862 in an attempt to persuade the patriarch to consecrate a native priest of Malabar to the episcopacy but the patriarch, who was facing increasing threats from Rome, declined to do so. Instead, the patriarch advised Thondanatt to seek the help of the independent East Syriac patriarch in Qudshanis. According to this suggestion, Thondanatt approached the Assyrian Patriarch Shimun XVIII who consecrated Thondanatt as metropolitan with the title Abdisho. But on returning to Malabar, he found himself unacceptable to the natives as he was consecrated by the Assyrian Patriarch rather than the Chaldean. Chavara allowed Thondanatt to function as the vicar of a parish church in Vilakkumadam near Pala.

A decade later, the Pazhayakoottukar who were under the padroado again pleaded for a bishop from the patriarch. By then, the pope had suppressed the Archdiocese of Cranganore and its Chaldean Syrian rite Christians were to be brought under the Archdiocese of Verapoly administered by the Carmelites. This was totally unacceptable to them and this risk encouraged them to seek the patriarch's intervention. In response, Patriarch Yawsep VI sent Metropolitan Elias Mellus to Malabar in 1874. The main motivator behind this was Philip Azziz, a Chaldean priest sent by the patriarch as his representative in Malabar. Mellus had previously tried, along with Patriarch Yawsep VI, though without success in the First Vatican Council, to re-establish Chaldean jurisdiction in India. In his journey to Malabar, he was accompanied by Corebishop Michael Agustinos and soon followed by Bishop Philip Yaqov Abraham. He made into the city of Thrissur, a newly established metropolis in the Kingdom of Cochin, his headquarters while Bishop Philip Yaqov travelled to the south into Travancore. Most of the Syrian churches under the padroado and some of the churches under Verapoly submitted to Mellus. Meanwhile, Bishop Philip Yaqov was forced to return to the ptriarch due to the strong opposition in the south, largely led by Priest Mani Nidhirikkal. Pope Pius IX issued excommunication against Patriarch Yawsep VI and Metropolitan Elias Mellus, for the patriarch's unauthorised intervention in Malabar. To relieve himself from the pope's excommunication, the patriarch was left with no other option than to recall the metropolitan from Malabar, which he reluctantly did in 1882. These upheavals in the Church of Malabar made Rome change its mind. Pope Leo XIII officially overturned the latinising policy and separated the Pazhayakoottukar from the Apostolic vicariate of Verapoly permanently. This decision paved way for the foundation of the Modern Syro-Malabar Church.

== Chaldean Syrian Church ==
Metropolitan Mellus entrusted his followers (or 'Mellusians') to his assistant Corebishop Michael Agustinos and, revealing to him about Bishop Abdisho Thondanatt who was living as a parish priest in Travancore, advised him to find the bishop for satisfying episcopal requirements. Abdisho Thondanatt was finally brought to Thrissur and recognised as a bishop, however Augustinos never handed over the administration of the church to him. Most of the followers of Mellus eventually returned to Roman obedience after the Syro-Malabar Church was established by separating the Chaldean Rite Pazhayakoottukar from the Carmelites of Verapoly, their professed rivals. However a significant minority remained steadfast to the Chaldean cause.

Abdisho Thondanatt died in 1900, leaving the followers of Mellus without a bishop till 1908, when the Assyrian patriarch finally sent a new bishop to Malabar. Corebishop Agustinos had been trying to bring a bishop from the Chaldean patriarch, but he was not willing to do so as he had strict orders from Rome not to take any such steps. Hence they approached the Assyrian patriarch, and he appointed Abimalech Timotheus as Metropolitan of India. Abimalech, influenced by Anglican Protestant thought, started a process of iconoclasm among the Mellusians. He pulled down the raredos of the churches and destroyed the statues and images. He also started a programme of replacing the old Malabar usage of the East Syriac Rite liturgy with the Rite of the Assyrian patriarchate. This created a new division among the Mellusians. Those, who opposed the radical stance of Metropolitan Abimlech organised themselves under Corepiscopus Augustine, and were known as Independents and those who stood with Abimalech were called Surays. The two factions engaged in legal suits, which the Independents finally lost, and the independents ultimately joined the Syro Malabar Church. Abimalech was succeeded by Thoma Darmo in 1952. In the 1960s, Darmo and Patriarch Shemʿon XXI engaged in a bitter rivalry and in 1968, Darmo was elected as a rival patriarch, thus forming the Ancient Church of the East. He consecrated two Indian bishops, including Aprem Mooken who became his successor as Metropolitan in Trichur. In 1971 Patriarch Shemʿon XXII consecrated a rival Metropolitan for Malabar, paving way to full blown schism in Indian church. In 1995, Metropolitan Aprem achieved full union of the two rival factions in India and the Chaldean Syrian Church in India became united with the Assyrian Church of the East led by Patriarch Dinkha IV.

== Syro-Malabar Church ==
The rising tensions between the Pazhayakoottukar and the Carmelite missionaries forced Rome to change its policy as it realised that granting true autonomy and self-government to the Pazhayakoottukar was the only feasible solution. In 1887, the Syrian Catholics were formally separated from the Vicariate of Verapoly, which was left for the Latin Catholics, and two new apostolic vicariates were established for the Syrians based in Kottayam and Thrissur. In 1896, they were reorganized into three vicariates namely, Trichur, Ernakulam, and Changanacherry, under the guidance of native bishops. This paved the way for the foundation of the modern Syro-Malabar Church. In 1911, a new vicariate was founded for the Pazhayakoor Thekkumbhagar (Tekkumbāgaṟ or Southists or Knanaya) based in Kottayam, following a similar event among the Puthenkoor Thekkumbhagar in 1910. In 1923, Rome established a complete Syro-Malabar Catholic hierarchy with the Archbishop of Ernakulam as the head. In 1992, the church was declared a major archiepiscopal church.

== See also ==
- Latin Catholics of Malabar
- Syro-Malankara Catholic Church

== Bibliography ==
- Bayly, Susan (2004). Saints, Goddesses and Kings: Muslims and Christians in South Indian Society, 1700–1900. Cambridge: Cambridge University Press. ISBN 9780521891035.
- Baum, Wilhelm; Winkler, Dietmar W. (2003). The Church of the East: A Concise History. London-New York: Routledge-Curzon. ISBN 9781134430192.
- Koonammakkal, Thomas (2013). Peter Bruns; Heinz Otto Luthe (eds.). "Syro-Malabar History and Traditions". Orientalia Christiana: Festschrift für Hubert Kaufhold zum 70. Geburtstag; pp. 259-276. Wiesbaden: Harrassowitz Verlag. ISBN 9783447068857.
- Malekandathil, Pius (2013). "Nazrani History and Discourse on Early Nationalism in Varthamanapusthakam". NSC Network.
- Medlycott, A (1912). "St. Thomas Christians". The Catholic Encyclopedia. New York: Robert Appleton Company.
- Menachery, George (2000). Thomapedia. Thomapedia. ISBN 81-87132-13-2. OCLC 56405161.
- Mingana, Alphonse (1926). "The Early Spread of Christianity in India" (PDF). Bulletin of the John Rylands Library. 10 (2): 435–514. doi:10.7227/BJRL.10.2.7.
- Mooken, Aprem (1975). Mar Abimalek Timotheus: A Biography. Trichur: Mar Narsai Press.
- Mooken, Aprem (1977). The Chaldean Syrian Church in India. Trichur: Mar Narsai Press.
- Mooken, Aprem (1983). The Chaldean Syrian Church of the East. Delhi: National Council of Churches in India.
- Mooken, Aprem (1987). Mar Abdisho Thondanat: A Biography. Trichur: Mar Narsai Press.
- Mundadan, Anthony Mathias; Thekkedath, Joseph (1982). History of Christianity in India. Vol. 2. Bangalore: Church History Association of India.
- Mundadan, Anthony Mathias (1984). Indian Christians: Search for Identity and Struggle for Autonomy. Bangalore: Dharmaram College.
- Perczel, István (2013). Peter Bruns; Heinz Otto Luthe (eds.). "Some New Documents on the Struggle of the Saint Thomas Christians to Maintain the Chaldaean Rite and Jurisdiction". Orientalia Christiana: Festschrift für Hubert Kaufhold zum 70. Geburtstag; pp. 415-436. Wiesbaden: Harrassowitz Verlag.
- Perczel, István (2018). Daniel King (ed.). Syriac Christianity in India. The Syriac World. Routledge. pp. 653–697. ISBN 9781317482116.
- Podipara, Placid J. (1970). The Thomas Christians. London: Darton, Longman and Todd. ISBN 978-0-232-51140-6.
- Wilmshurst, David (2000). The Ecclesiastical Organisation of the Church of the East, 1318–1913. Louvain: Peeters Publishers. ISBN 9789042908765.
