= Addai II Giwargis =

Iraqi Catholicos-Patriarch (1948–2022)

His Holiness Mar Addai II Giwargis
- Catholicos Patriarch of the Ancient Church of the East
- Native name: ܡܪܝ ܐܕܝ ܬܪܝܢܐ
- Church: Ancient Church of the East ܥܕܬܐ ܥܬܝܩܬܐ ܕܡܕܢܚܐ
- Archdiocese: Patriarchal Archdiocese of Baghdad and Basra
- See: Apostolic See of Seleucia-Ctesiphon
- Installed: 20 February 1972
- Term ended: 11 February 2022
- Predecessor: Mar Thoma Darmo (1968–1969)
- Successor: Mar Gewargis Younan
- Previous post: Metropolitan of Iraq (September 1968)

Orders
- Ordination: 20 February 1972 at St. Zaia Cathedral (Baghdad, Iraq)
- Rank: Catholicos-Patriarch

Personal details
- Born: Shlemun Giwargis; 6 January 1948 Mosul, Iraq
- Died: 11 February 2022 (aged 74) Phoenix, Arizona, U.S.
- Denomination: Ancient Church of the East
- Occupation: Clergy

Mar Addai II (Syriac: ܡܪܝ ܐܕܝ ܬܪܝܢܐ; born Shlemun Giwargis Syriac: ܫܠܝܡܘܢ ܓܝܘܪܓܝܣ 6 January 1948 – 11 February 2022) was Catholicos-Patriarch of the Ancient Church of the East. He resided in the Apostolic See of Seleucia-Ctesiphon in Baghdad, Iraq.

== Early life and consecration ==
Mar Addai II was born on 6 January 1948, in Mosul, the capital of the Nineveh governorate in Iraq. He was ordained to the diaconate and elevated to the priesthood on 15 September 1968 in Baghdad. He was consecrated a metropolitan of the Church of the East for Iraq on 22 September 1968 at Mar Zaia Cathedral in Baghdad, Iraq. Following the death of Mar Thoma Darmo, he was elected as Catholicos-Patriarch of the Ancient Church of the East and was consecrated on 20 February 1972 by Mar Narsai Toma, Metropolitan of Kirkuk, and Mar Thoma Eramia, Metropolitan of Nineveh.

== Tenure as Catholicos-Patriarch ==
In December 1969, as acting patriarch, Mar Addai II elevated Mar Narsai Toma to Metropolitan of Kirkuk and Mar Toma Eramia as Metropolitan of Mosul and Northern Iraq. He was officially elected to the position of Catholicos-Patriarch in February 1970, several months after the death of Mar Thoma Darmo. Two years later, on 20 February 1972, he was consecrated as Patriarch of the Ancient Church of the East by Mar Narsai and Mar Toma. The ordination took place at St. Zaia Cathedral in Iraq.

On Sunday, 24 September 2006, St Mary's Cathedral, the home of Mar Addai II, was bombed. The cathedral, located in the Riyadh district of Baghdad, experienced dual bombings: A small improvised explosive device preceded a car detonation setting off a large number of explosives. The bombings occurred within minutes of each other. The bombing was carefully timed to occur just as parishioners exited the church following Sunday morning services. Two civilians were killed in the attacks, in addition to the 20 that sustained injuries.

== Death ==
Mar Addai II died in Phoenix, Arizona, on February 11, 2022, at age 74.

== Sources ==
- Baum, Wilhelm; Winkler, Dietmar W. (2003). The Church of the East: A Concise History. London-New York: Routledge-Curzon. ISBN 9781134430192.
- Baumer, Christoph (2006). The Church of the East: An Illustrated History of Assyrian Christianity. London-New York: Tauris. ISBN 9781845111151.
- Mooken, Aprem (1974). Mar Thoma Darmo: A Biography. Trichur: Mar Narsai Press.
- Mooken, Aprem (2003). The History of the Assyrian Church of the East in the Twentieth Century. Kottayam: St. Ephrem Ecumenical Research Institute.
- Mooken, Aprem (2004). Patriarch Mar Dinkha IV: The Man and His Message. Trichur: Mar Narsai Press. ISBN 9788190220507.
- Hage, Wolfgang (2007). Das orientalische Christentum. Stuttgart: Kohlhammer Verlag. ISBN 9783170176683.
- Coakley, James F. (1996). "The Church of the East since 1914" (PDF). Bulletin of the John Rylands Library. 78 (3): 179–198. doi:10.7227/BJRL.78.3.14.

Preceded by Thoma Darmo	Catholicos-Patriarch of the Ancient Church of the East; 1972–2022	Succeeded by Yacob III Daniel
