= Awgin Kuriakose =

Indian metropolitan of the Chaldean Syrian Church

His Beatitude Mar Awgin Kuriakose
- Metropolitan of India and Southern Gulf Countries
- Church: Chaldean Syrian Church (Assyrian Church of the East)
- Metropolis: Archdiocese of India and Southern Gulf Countries
- See: Marth Mariam Cathedral, Thrissur
- Appointed: 8 January 2023
- Predecessor: Mar Aprem Mooken

Orders
- Ordination: 17 January 2010

Personal details
- Born: May 21, 1974 (age 52) Vellanikodu, Marottichal, Thrissur, Kerala, India
- Denomination: Christianity (Assyrian Church of the East)
- Parents: Pachamparambil Poulose and Achamma
- Education: University of Calicut; University of Serampore; Dharmaram Vidya Kshetram; Oakland University (PhD candidate)

Mar Awgin Kuriakose (born 21 May 1974) is the Metropolitan of the Chaldean Syrian Church (Assyrian Church of the East) in India, overseeing the Archdiocese of India and the Southern Gulf Countries. He was installed as Metropolitan on 8 January 2023, succeeding Mar Aprem Mooken, and had previously served as Patriarchal Administrator from September 2021.

== Early life and education ==
Mar Awgin was born on 21 May 1974 in Vellanikodu, Marottichal, Thrissur, Kerala, the second of four children of Pachamparambil Poulose and Achamma, members of Mar Mathai Sleeha Church Parish. Demonstrating early engagement in church activities, he completed high school in 1989 and entered seminary from 1989 to 1995, during which he earned a B.A. in economics at Calicut University. He then pursued theological studies at the Jacobite Syrian Seminary in Mulamthuruthy and was ordained deacon on 21 April 1996.

He subsequently studied at Gurukul Lutheran Theological College in Chennai, earning a B.D. through the Senate of Serampore in 2000 while serving as assistant vicar at Mar Qardhakh Sahdha Church, Chennai. He was ordained priest on 13 June 2000 by Metropolitan Mar Aprem, then served as vicar of St Thomas Church in Ernakulam. In 2001, he was appointed vicar of Mar Timotheus Church in Bengaluru and began postgraduate studies at Dharmaram Vidya Kshetram, earning an M.Th. in Biblical Theology. He enrolled for Ph.D. studies in 2004 and later continued at Oakland University in New Zealand.

== Ecclesiastical career ==
On 17 January 2010, Mar Awgin was consecrated Episcopa (bishop) for the Indian Archdiocese by His Holiness Mar Dinkha IV at the first Holy Synod held in Thrissur, India. Mar Aprem Mooken retired in September 2021; Mar Awgin was appointed Patriarchal Administrator of the Archdiocese of India and UAE by Patriarch Mar Awa III that same month, granted full jurisdiction over the Indian and Gulf churches.

On 8 January 2023, a formal ordination ceremony as Metropolitan took place at Marth Mariam Cathedral, Thrissur, presided over by Patriarch Mar Awa III. Attending were senior prelates such as Mar Aprim Athneil (Syria), Mar Paulus Benjamin (USA), Mar Narsai Benyamin (New Zealand/Canada), and others. Insiders described the event as marking a new chapter in the life of the Church in India.

== Ecumenical involvement ==
Mar Awgin has participated in international theological dialogue. In November 2024, during the XVI plenary session of the Joint International Commission for Theological Dialogue between the Catholic Church and the Assyrian Church of the East, he presented a paper entitled "The Commemoration of Saints in the Church of the East" at the Vatican. His involvement reflects a strong engagement with ecumenical discourse.

== Metropolitanate ==
As Metropolitan, Mar Awgin oversees the Chaldean Syrian Church's institutions, clergy, and parishes across India and the Southern Gulf, maintaining the East Syriac liturgical and spiritual tradition among the Saint Thomas Christian community. The Archdiocese is headquartered at Marth Mariam Cathedral in Thrissur.

== See also ==
- Chaldean Syrian Church
- Assyrian Church of the East
- Christianity in India
