= India (East Syriac ecclesiastical province) =

Ecclesiastical province of the Church of the East

Metropolitanate of All India ܒܬ ܗܙܕܐ
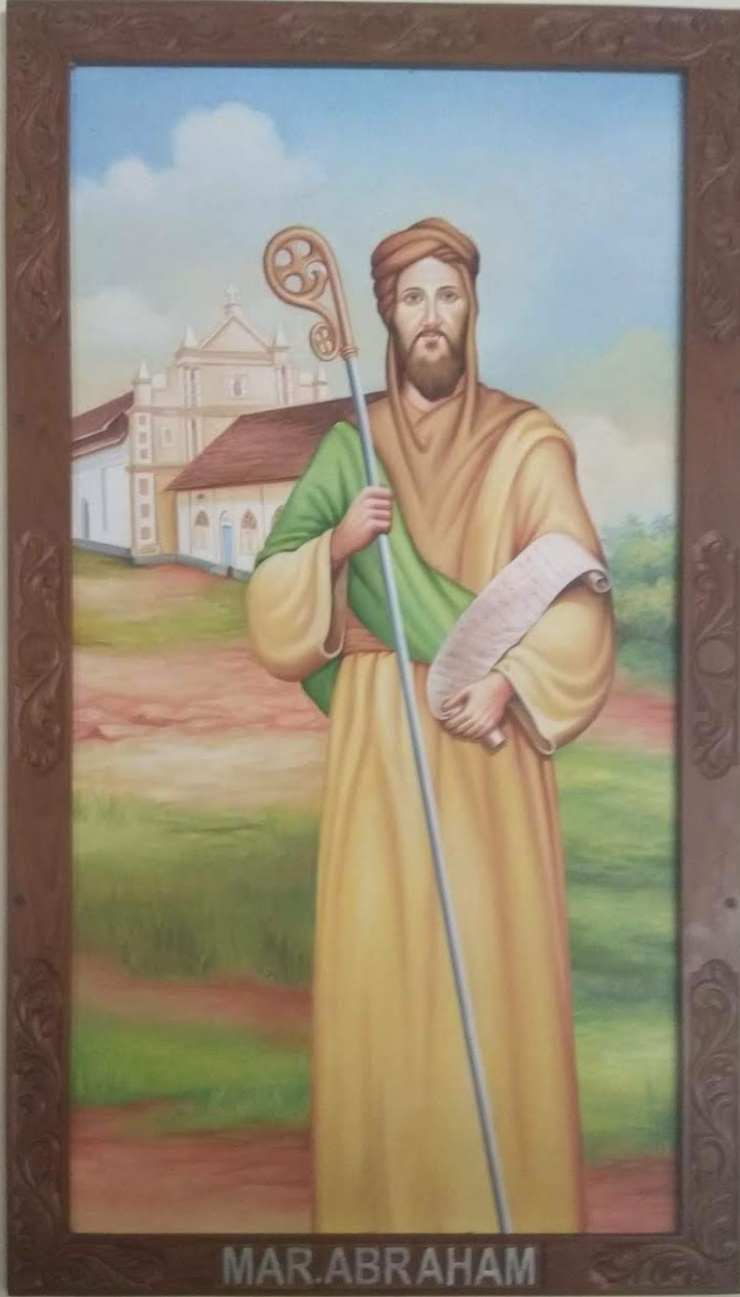
- Metropolitan Abraham (1597) - the last Metropolitan of the Archdiocese

Location
- Country: India
- Territory: India and China
- Ecclesiastical province: India
- Metropolitan: From 8th century AD
- Headquarters: several

Information
- Denomination: Saint Thomas Christians
- Sui iuris church: Church of the East
- Rite: East Syriac Rite
- Established: AD 50s
- Cathedral: several

Metropolitanate of India (Syriac: Beth Hindaye) was an East Syriac ecclesiastical province of the Church of the East, at least nominally, from the seventh to the sixteenth century. The Malabar region (Kerala) of India had long been home to a thriving Eastern Christian community, known as the Saint Thomas Christians. The community traces its origins to the evangelical activity of Thomas the Apostle in the 1st century. The Christian communities in India used the East Syriac Rite, the traditional liturgical rite of the Church of the East. They also adopted some aspects of Dyophysitism of Theodore of Mopsuestia, often inaccurately referred as Nestorianism, in accordance with theology of the Church of the East. It is unclear when the relation between Saint Thomas Christian and the Church of the East was established. Initially, they belonged to the metropolitan province of Fars, but were detached from that province in the 7th century, and again in the 8th, and given their own metropolitan bishop.

Due to the distance between India and the seat of the Patriarch of the Church of the East, communication with the church's heartland was often spotty, and the province was frequently without a bishop. An eleventh-century reference states that the metropolitan province of India had been 'suppressed', due to communication difficulties. At the beginning of the fourteenth century the Indian Church was again dependent on the Church of the East. Although India was supplied with bishops from the Middle East, the effective control lay in the hands of an indigenous priest known as Arkkadiyakkon or Archdeacon. He was the community leader of Saint Thomas Christians. Even in times when there were multiple foreign bishops, there was only one archdeacon for entire Saint Thomas Community. As such, the Indian church was largely autonomous in operation, though the authority of the Patriarch was always respected.

In the 15th century, the Portuguese arrived in India. Initially, the relationship between native Saint Thomas Christians and the Portuguese were friendly. But gradually, the ritual diversities widened and the relationship deteriorated. After a section of the Church of the East became Catholic (modern day Chaldean Catholic Church) in 1553, both the Nestorian and Chaldean Churches intermittently attempted to regain their old influence in India by sending their bishops to the Malabar Christians. In 1565, the Chaldean Catholic Archdiocese of Angamaly was established to provide jurisdiction for the Chaldean Church in India. On occasion the Vatican supported the claims of Catholic bishops from the Chaldean Church. However, the Portuguese ascendancy was formalised at the Synod of Diamper in 1599, which effectively suppressed the historic East Syriac metropolitan province of India. Angamaly, the former seat of the East Syriac metropolitan diocese, was downgraded to a suffragan diocese of the Padroado Archdiocese of Goa.

Today, the Chaldean Syrian Church of India is the continuation of the East Syriac ecclesiastical province in the Indian subcontinent, being an archdiocese of the Assyrian Church of the East. It has around 15,000 communicants.

== India-Persia Church relations from 3rd to 14th Century ==
=== Sassanian period ===
The bishop David of Maishan, who flourished c.285, during the reign of the bishop Papa of Seleucia-Ctesiphon (c.280–315), left his seat to evangelise India.

The Nestorian monk Cosmas Indicopleustes, who visited the Christians of India around the middle of the 6th century, mentioned three distinct areas of Christian settlement in India: in northwest India, around the trading port of Calliana near Mumbai, from which brass, sisam logs and cloth were exported; along the Malabar coast in southern India 'in the land called Male, where the pepper grows' and Sri Lanka (Sielediva). By the end of the Sassanian period the Christians of India had accepted the leadership of the church of Fars, which also claimed Saint Thomas as its founder. Cosmas noted that the Christians of Calliana had a bishop appointed from Fars, while the Christians of the Malabar coast and Ceylon had priests and deacons but not bishops. The connection with Fars went back at least as far as the late 5th century, when the metropolitan Maʿna of Rev Ardashir sent copies of his Syriac translations of Greek devotional works to India for the use of the Indian clergy.

=== Umayyad period ===
The patriarch Ishoʿyahb III (649–59) raised India to the status of a metropolitan province, probably because of the unsatisfactory oversight of the metropolitan Shemʿon of Fars. A number of letters from Ishoʿyahb to Shemʿon have survived, in one of which Ishoʿyahb complained that Shemʿon had refused to consecrate a bishop for 'Kalnah' (the 'Calliana' of Cosmas Indicopleustes), because the Indian Christians had offended him in some way.

According to the fourteenth-century writer ʿAbdishoʿ of Nisibis, the patriarch Sliba-zkha (714–28) created metropolitan provinces for Herat, Samarqand, India and China. If ʿAbdishoʿ is right, India's status as a metropolitan province must have lapsed shortly after it was created by Ishoʿyahb III. An alternative, and perhaps more likely, possibility, is that Sliba-zkha consecrated a metropolitan for India, perhaps in response to an appeal from the Indian Christians, to fill the place of the bishop sent there by Ishoʿyahb half a century earlier.

=== Abbasid period ===
After several centuries of intermittent dependence on the Persian-speaking metropolitans of Fars, who also boasted of their descent from the apostle Thomas, the Saint Thomas Christians of India were again brought under the authority of the patriarchs of Seleucia-Ctesiphon towards the end of the eighth century. The patriarch Timothy I, who was determined to break the power of the bishops of Rev Ardashir, definitively detached India from the province of Fars and made it a separate metropolitan province. There is also a tradition in the Indian church that two 'Syrian' bishops, Shapur and Peroz, were sent to Quilon from Mesopotamia in 823, the year of Timothy's death. They were accompanied by 'the famous man Sabrishoʿ', perhaps a metropolitan consecrated by Timothy for India. This tradition was recorded by Mattai Veticutel in the following words:

In the year 823, East Syriac fathers again came, Mar Shapur and Mar Peroz, accompanied by the famous man Sabrishoʿ. They came to the town of Quilon, went to the king Shakirbirti, and asked for lands. The king gave them as much land as they wished. So they too built a church and town in the country of Quilon. Thereafter East Syriac bishops and metropolitans came more often by order of the catholicus, who used to send them.

A few decades later, according to the sixteenth-century Portuguese writer Diogo do Couto, the Malabar church sent a delegation to Mesopotamia to ask for new bishops to be sent out to them. Their old bishops (perhaps Shapur and Peroz) were dead, and their church had now only one deacon surviving. The catholicus thereupon consecrated a metropolitan named Yohannan for India, and two suffragan bishops, one of whom, 'Mar Dua', was appointed to the island of Soqotra, and the other, Thomas, to 'Masin', traditionally identified with southern China. Yohannan fixed his metropolitan seat at Cranganore. These events seem to have taken place around 880, perhaps during the patriarchate of Enosh.

Neither India (Beth Hindaye) nor China (Beth Sinaye) are listed as metropolitan provinces of the Church of the East in the detailed list of metropolitan provinces and dioceses drawn up in 893 by Eliya of Damascus. Eliya's list contains very few errors, and it is possible that neither province had a metropolitan at this period. This is certainly likely in the case of China, in the wake of the expulsion of Christians from the capital Chang'an by the emperor Wuzong in 845, though perhaps less so in the case of India.

=== Seljuq period ===
According to the eleventh-century Mukhtasar, a detailed list in Arabic of ecclesiastical provinces and dioceses of the Church of the East, the metropolitan province of India had been suppressed 'because it has become impossible to reach it'.

=== Mongol period ===
At the beginning of the fourteenth century the Indian church was again dependent upon the Church of the East. The dating formula in the colophon to a manuscript copied in June 1301 in the church of Mar Quriaqos in Cranganore mentions the patriarch Yahballaha III (whom it curiously describes as Yahballaha V), and the metropolitan Yaʿqob of India. Cranganore, described in this manuscript as 'the royal city', was doubtless the metropolitan seat for India at this time.

In the 1320s the anonymous biographer of the patriarch Yahballaha III and his friend Rabban Bar Sauma praised the achievement of the Church of the East in converting 'the Indians, Chinese and Turks'.

India was listed as one of the Church of the East's 'provinces of the exterior' by the historian ʿAmr in 1348.

== Appointment of East Syriac bishops for India, 1490–1503 ==
At the end of the fifteenth century the Church of the East responded to a request by the Saint Thomas Christians for bishops to be sent out to them. In 1490 (or more probably, as has been suggested by Heleen Murre-van den Berg, 1499), two Christians from Malabar arrived in Gazarta to petition the Nestorian patriarch to consecrate a bishop for their church. Two monks of the monastery of Mar Awgin were consecrated bishops and were sent to India. The patriarch Eliya V (1503–4) consecrated three more bishops for India in April 1503. These bishops sent a report to the patriarch from India in 1504, describing the condition of the Nestorian church in India and reporting the recent arrival of the Portuguese. Eliya had already died by the time this letter arrived in Mesopotamia, and it was received by his successor, Shemʿon VI (1504–38).

== Bishops from traditional and Chaldean Patriarchates and clashes with the Portuguese, 1503–99 ==
=== Rival bishops Abraham and Joseph Sulaqa reaching India ===
One of the bishops consecrated in 1503, Mar Yaʿqob, worked alongside the Portuguese ecclesiastical hierarchy in India until his death in 1553. After the death of Metropolitan Mar Yaʿqob and of a schism in the Church of the East, which resulted in there being two rival Patriarchs, one of whom entered communion with the Catholic Church. Both patriarchs - the Nestorian patriarch and Chaldean Catholic patriarch - began sending bishops to India. Apparently the first bishop came to Malabar was Mar Abraham sent by the traditionalist Nestorian patriarch. It is not known exactly when Abraham reached Malabar, but he must have been there already in 1556. Approximately at the same time, the Chaldean Patriarch Abdisho IV also sent out a bishop Joseph Sulaqa, the brother of the first Chaldean patriarch Yohannan Sulaqa, to Malabar.

Mar Joseph was sent to India with letters of introduction from the Pope to the Portuguese authorities; he was besides accompanied by Bishop Ambrose, a Dominican and papal commissary to the first patriarch, by his socius Father Anthony, and by Mar Elias Hormaz, Archbishop of Diarbekir. They arrived at Goa in November 1556, and were detained at Goa for eighteen months before being allowed to enter the diocese. when the Portuguese were finally alerted by the presence of Mar Abraham and allowed Mar Joseph to occupy his see. Proceeding to Cochin they lost Bishop Ambrose; the others travelled through Malabar for two and a half years on foot, visiting every church and detached settlement. Mar Elias returned to his own archbishopric of Diarbekir in Mesopotamia. In this way, nominally there were two rival East Syrian bishops in Malabar until 1558.

=== Bishop Abraham joining in Chaldean Patriarchate ===
Faced with a schism, Mar Joseph turned to the Portuguese for help. The Portuguese arrested Mar Abraham and shipped him to Europe. But on the way he succeeded in escaping at Mozambique, found his way back to Mesopotamia, and went straight to Mar Abdisho IV the Chaldean Patriarch, having realized from the Indian experience that unless he secured a nomination from him it would be difficult to establish himself in Malabar. Patriarch Abdisho IV, who re-consecrated Mar Abraham as bishop of Chaldean Catholic Church and sent him to Rome. But all the orders which he had received had been conferred in the independent Eastern church, and were therefore from the strict Roman point of view invalid. In order to set all doubts at rest, Pope Pius IV arranged for all the orders up to and including the episcopate to be quietly conferred on Mar Abraham. The Latin Patriarch of San Severino had ordered Mar Abraham at Venice, from tonsure to priesthood. Thus for the third time consecrated as bishop. IV. However, Abraham succeeded also in obtaining his nomination and creation as Archbishop of Angamaly from the pope. The Pope wanted Mar Abraham to reign jointly with Mar Joseph and he requested patriarch Abdisho to divide the diocese between Mar Joseph and Mar Abraham. Both the Patriarch and the Pope, having joined together in sending Mar Abraham to India, gave him authority to divide the sphere of Thomas Christians between himself and Mar Joseph (But this arrangement was never carried into effect, since Mar Joseph having already again been arrested and exiled for a third time, died in Rome in 1569.)

=== Bishop Abraham as Metropolitan of Angamaly ===
Mar Abraham reached Goa in 1568. In spite of the express approbation by pope, he was not welcomed by the Portuguese viceroy in India and was arrested a second time. Mar Abraham was detained in a convent, but escaped and entered Malabar and there he directed his faithful in defiance of the Portuguese until his death. Meanwhile, the Nestorian patriarch who discovered that Mar Abraham had switched allegiance to the Chaldean side, sent another metropolitan, Mar Simon to Malabar. Mar Simon worked in Malabar for eight years but was captured by the Portuguese in 1584 and sent to Lisbon where he died in 1599. Although the Diocese of Kochi was established in 1553 and placed under the Archdiocese of Goa, the Saint Thomas Christians continued with the Archdiocese of Angamaly under the leadership of Mar Abraham. Mar Abraham died in 1597.

== Synod of Diamper and latinisation ==
After the death of Mar Abraham, the Archbishop of Goa, Aleixo de Menezes, started his efforts to bring Angamaly under Goa. Menezes convened the Synod of Diamper in 1599, which implemented various liturgical and structural reforms in the Indian Church. The diocese of Angamaly, which was now formally placed under the Portuguese Padroado and made suffragan to the archdiocese of Goa. The east syriac bishop was then removed from jurisdiction in India and replaced by a latin bishop; the East Syriac liturgy of Addai and Mari was “purified from error”; and Latin vestments, rituals, and customs were introduced to replace the ancient traditions. Any attempts of Thomas Christians to contact bishops — even Chaldean Catholic ones — in the Middle East were foiled.

== 18th and 19th century Nestorian and Chaldean missions to India ==
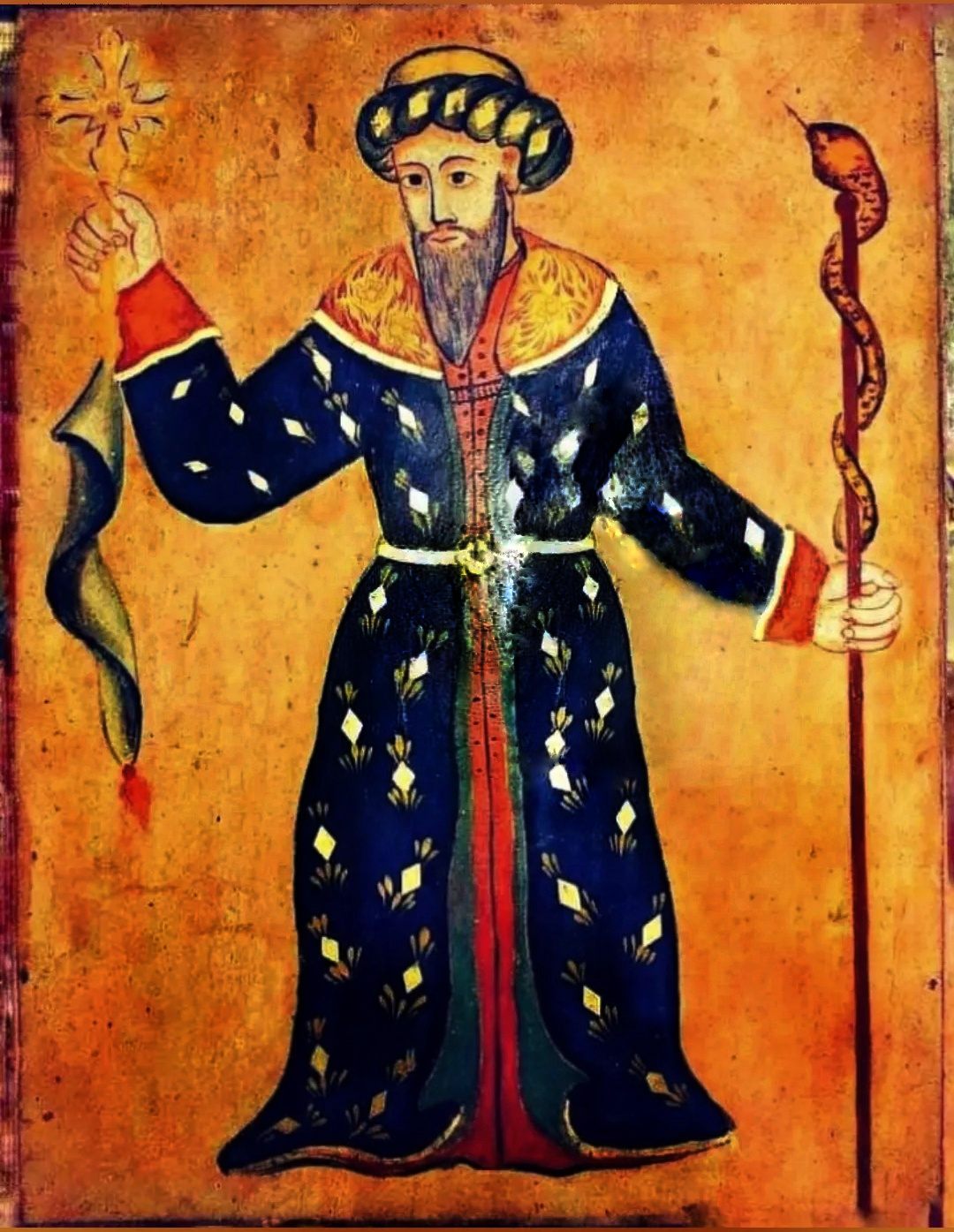
Gabriel of Ardishai

Since 1665 most of the Syrian Rite Christians along the Malabar coast of India were either Syrian Catholics or Malankara Syrians. Nevertheless, sporadic attempts were made from time to time to restore the traditional ties between the Saint Thomas Christians and the Church of the East.

=== The mission of Shemʿon of Ada, 1701–20 ===
The Chaldean metropolitan Shemʿon of ʿAda, who had been consecrated by the Amid patriarch Joseph I for the Catholics of the Urmia plain, travelled from Rome to India in 1700, with the approval of the Vatican authorities, to minister to the Chaldeans of Malabar. According to his own account, preserved in a letter to the Sacred Congregation written in March/April 1701 from Surat, he travelled through Spain to Portugal, and took ship from Lisbon to Goa and Surat. In Surat he met the Capuchin Francesco Maria, who had been his confessor years earlier in Amid, and received a letter signed by 30 priests and 10 deacons of the Malabar Chaldeans, imploring him to come to them and offering to pay his travelling expenses. The end of the letter is lost, and in the final paragraph to survive he mentioned that the Capuchins had wished to send him to the French territory of Pondicherry, but he had finally persuaded them to send Father Francesco with him to Malabar. Shemʿon went on to play an important part in the struggle between the Vatican and the Portuguese authorities over ecclesiastical privilege in India. On 22 May 1701 he consecrated the superior of the Chaldean seminary of Verapoly, the Carmelite Ange-François de Sainte-Thérèse, apostolic vicar of the Chaldeans of Malabar. The Latin bishops had refused to consecrate him, and it may have been specifically with this aim in mind that the Sacred Congregation had sent Shemʿon to India. Shemʿon appears to have remained in India for several years, and died on 16 August 1720.

=== The mission of Gabriel of Ardishai, 1704–39 ===
The Mosul patriarchs also attempted to reassert their control over the Syriac Christians of India around the beginning of the eighteenth century. The metropolitan Gabriel of the Urmia diocese of Ardishai was sent to India in 1704 by the Nestorian patriarch Eliya XI Marogin (1700–22). Doubtless appreciating the difficulties he was likely to encounter as a Nestorian, Gabriel made a Catholic profession of faith in the presence of the Chaldean patriarch Joseph I at Amid before he set off on his journey. When he arrived in India he was obliged to make a further profession of faith and to swear a solemn pledge of allegiance to the Portuguese ecclesiastical authorities. Ignoring these undertakings, Gabriel proceeded to offer a lively opposition to the Jacobite metropolitan Thomas IV. Forty-two churches came over to him, leaving the Jacobites with only twenty-five. Thomas appealed to the Jacobite patriarch at Antioch for help, but without response. The Jacobites only fully recovered their hold on the Malabar church after Gabriel's death in 1739.

=== The mission of Thoma Rokkos and Elias Mellus ===
The Chaldean Catholic Church, in the nineteenth century, sent two Metropolitans, Thoma Rokkos and Elias Mellus to India to restore their former jurisdiction there. These attempts were spoiled by the pope by excommunicating the bishops and threatening excommunication on the Chaldean Patriarch.

== Chaldean Syrian Church of India ==
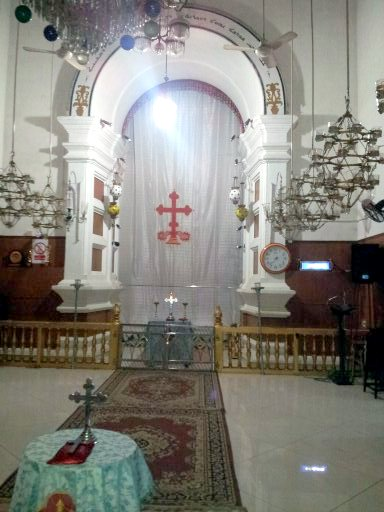
Marth Mariam Cathedral in Thrissur, India

Today, the Chaldean Syrian Church is the continuation of the East Syriac ecclesiastical province in India, being an archdiocese of the Assyrian Church of the East. It has around 15,000 communicants.

== See also ==
- Indo-Persian ecclesiastical relations

== Sources ==
- Abbeloos, J. B., and Lamy, T. J., Bar Hebraeus, Chronicon Ecclesiasticum (3 vols, Paris, 1877)
- Assemani, J. S., Bibliotheca Orientalis Clementino-Vaticana (4 vols, Rome, 1719–28)
- Bayly, Susan (2004). Saints, Goddesses and Kings: Muslims and Christians in South Indian Society, 1700–1900. Cambridge: Cambridge University Press. ISBN 9780521891035.
- Baum, Wilhelm; Winkler, Dietmar W. (2003). The Church of the East: A Concise History. London-New York: Routledge-Curzon. ISBN 9781134430192.
- Brock, Sebastian P. (2011). "Thomas Christians". In Sebastian P. Brock; Aaron M. Butts; George A. Kiraz; Lucas Van Rompay (eds.). Gorgias Encyclopedic Dictionary of the Syriac Heritage: Electronic Edition. Gorgias Press.
- Chabot, Jean-Baptiste (1902). Synodicon orientale ou recueil de synodes nestoriens (PDF). Paris: Imprimerie Nationale.
- Dauvillier, J., 'Les provinces chaldéennes "de l'extérieur" au Moyen Âge', in Mélanges Cavallera (Toulouse, 1948), reprinted in Histoire et institutions des Églises orientales au Moyen Âge (Variorum Reprints, London, 1983)
- Fiey, Jean Maurice (1993). Pour un Oriens Christianus Novus: Répertoire des diocèses syriaques orientaux et occidentaux. Beirut: Orient-Institut. ISBN 9783515057189.
- Gismondi, H., Maris, Amri, et Salibae: De Patriarchis Nestorianorum Commentaria I: Amri et Salibae Textus (Rome, 1896)
- Gismondi, H., Maris, Amri, et Salibae: De Patriarchis Nestorianorum Commentaria II: Maris textus arabicus et versio Latina (Rome, 1899)
- Le Quien, M., Oriens Christianus (Paris, 1740)
- Menon, A. Sreedhara (1965). "Portuguese and the Malabar Church". Kerala District Gazetteers: Ernakulam. Trivandrum: The Superintendent of Government Presses, Government Press: 128, 131–144.
- Mingana, Alphonse (1926). "The Early Spread of Christianity in India" (PDF). Bulletin of the John Rylands Library. 10 (2): 435–514. doi:10.7227/BJRL.10.2.7. Archived from the original (PDF) on 2021-01-24.
- Perczel, István (2013). Peter Bruns; Heinz Otto Luthe (eds.). "Some New Documents on the Struggle of the Saint Thomas Christians to Maintain the Chaldaean Rite and Jurisdiction". Orientalia Christiana: Festschrift für Hubert Kaufhold zum 70. Geburtstag; pp. 415-436. Wiesbaden: Harrassowitz Verlag.
- Perczel, István (2018). Daniel King (ed.). Syriac Christianity in India. The Syriac World. Routledge. pp. 653–697. ISBN 9781317482116.
- Scher, Addai (ed. and tr.). "Histoire nestorienne inédite: Chronique de Séert. Première partie." Patrologia Orientalis 4.3 (1908), 5.2 (1910)
- Tisserant, E., 'Église malabare', Dictionnaire de Théologie Catholique, 14 (1934), 3,089–162
- Tisserant, E., 'Église nestorienne', Dictionnaire de Théologie Catholique, 11 (1931), 157–323
- Wallis Budge, E. A., The Monks of Kublai Khan (London, 1928)
- Wilmshurst, David (2000). The Ecclesiastical Organisation of the Church of the East, 1318–1913. Louvain: Peeters Publishers. ISBN 9789042908765.
- Wilmshurst, David (2011). The martyred Church: A History of the Church of the East. London: East & West Publishing Limited. ISBN 9781907318047.
