= Aprem Mooken =

Assyrian Church of the East Metropolitan of India (1940–2025)

His Beatitude Dr. Mar Aprem
- Metropolitan of the Chaldean Syrian Church
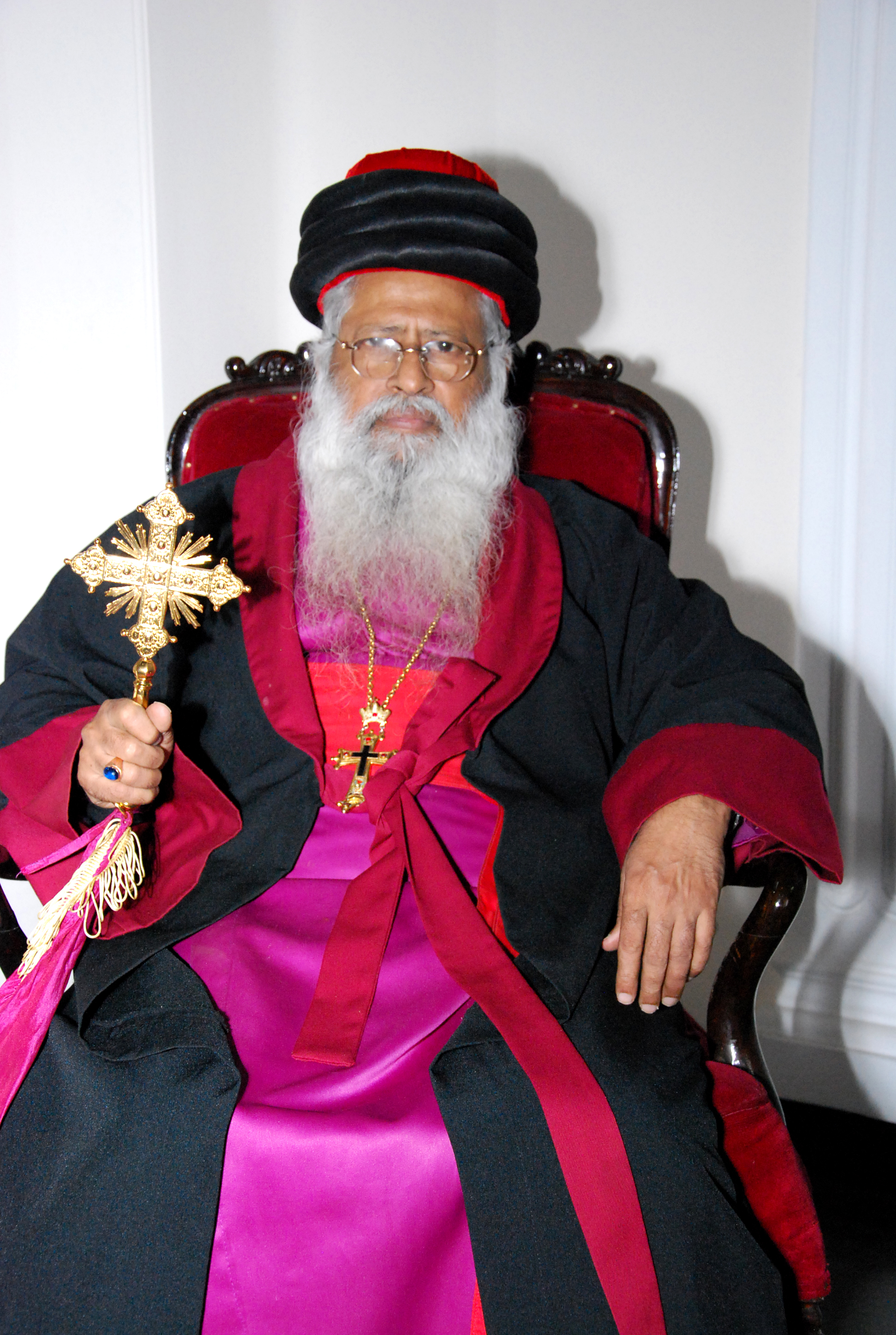
- Church: Assyrian Church of the East ܥܕܬܐ ܕܡܕܢܚܐ ܕܐܬܘܖ̈ܝܐ (of India) (Chaldean Syrian Church)
- Metropolis: India
- See: Marth Mariam Cathedral
- Installed: 29 September 1968
- Predecessor: Thoma Darmo
- Successor: Awgin Kuriakose

Orders
- Ordination: 29 September 1968, Baghdad, Iraq by Thoma Darmo
- Rank: Metropolitan

Personal details
- Born: George Mooken; 13 June 1940 Thrissur, Kingdom of Cochin, India
- Died: 7 July 2025 (aged 85)
- Denomination: Chaldean Syrian Church
- Residence: Thrissur, Kerala, India
- Parents: Devassy Mooken and Kochu Mariyam Mooken
- Occupation: clergy
- Education: Serampore University, Union Theological Seminary (New York City), St. Thomas College, Thrissur

Aprem Mooken (born George Mooken; 13 June 1940 – 7 July 2025) was a prelate who served as the Metropolitan of the Assyrian Church of the East (Classical Syriac: ܥܕܬܐ ܕܡܕܢܚܐ ܕܐܬܘܖ̈ܝܐ) in India (Chaldean Syrian Church).

== Biography ==
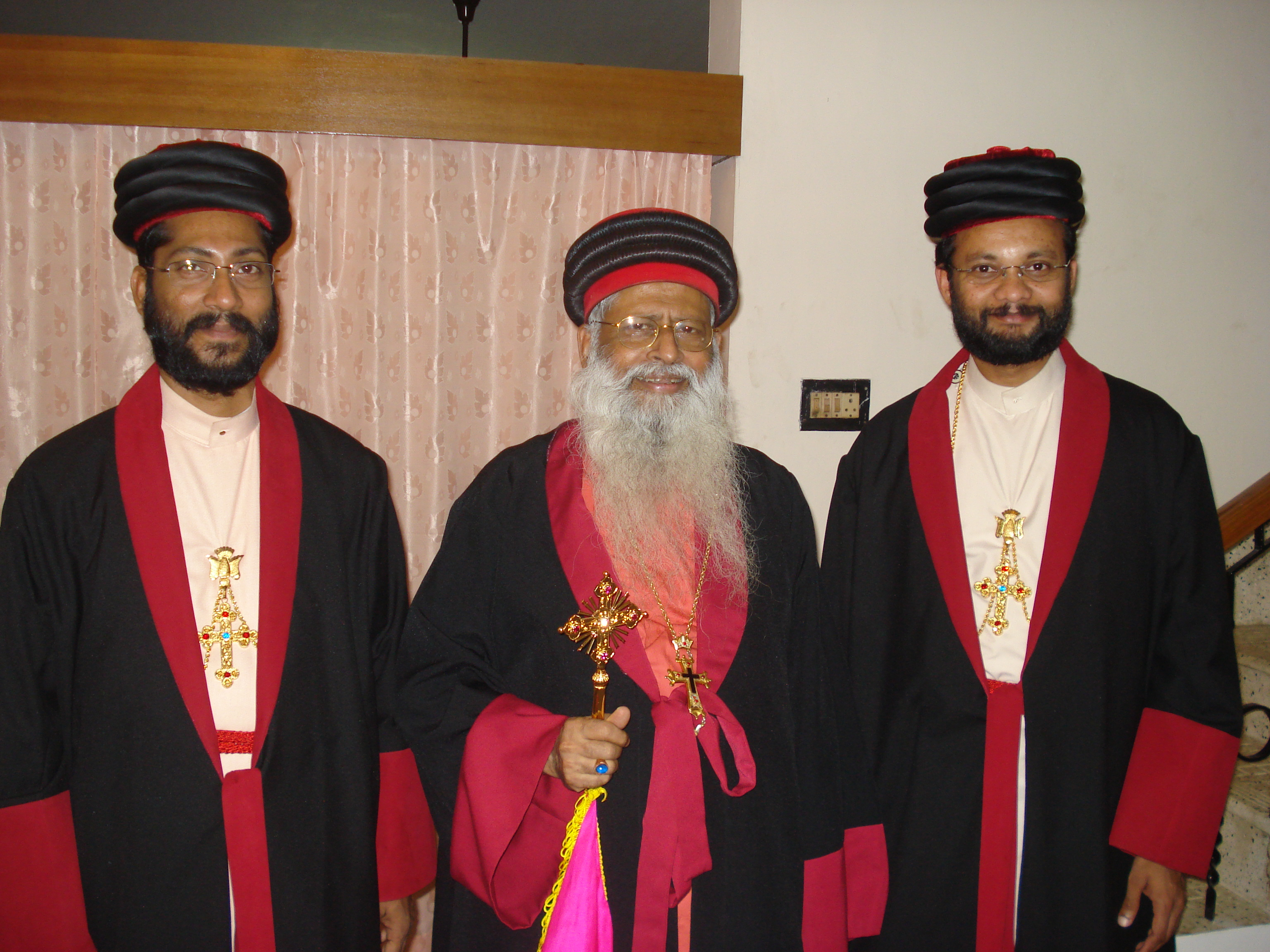
Mooken between bishops Yohannan Yoseph (left) and Awgin Kuriakose.

Mooken was born on 13 June 1940 in Thrissur, Kingdom of Cochin, India.

He earned master's degrees in Church History from both the United Theological College, Bangalore (1966) and the Union Theological Seminary, New York (1967). He was ordained a deacon on 25 June 1961, and a priest four years later on 13 June 1965. He was a candidate for Doctor of Theology (Th. D.) degree at Princeton Theological Seminary, USA, when he was consecrated as Bishop on 21 September 1968, and eight days later as Metropolitan at Baghdad, Iraq by Thoma Darmo, Catholicos Patriarch of the Ancient Church of the East. In 1976 he earned his D.Th. degree from Serampore University near Calcutta. He was created Associate Companion of the Roll of Honour of the Memorial of Merit of King Charles the Martyr in 2012.

On 7 July 2025 Aprem died at the age of 85.

== See also ==
- Ancient Church of the East
