= Marth Mariam Cathedral =

Coordinates: 10°31′06″N 76°13′02″E

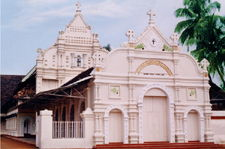
- Marth Mariam Cathedral, Thrissur City
- Marth Mariam Cathedral
- Location: Thrissur
- Country: India
- Denomination: Chaldean Syrian Church
- Previous denomination: Syro-Malabar Church

History
- Former name: Our Lady of Dolours Church
- Founder: Sakthan Thampuran

Architecture
- Completed: 1814

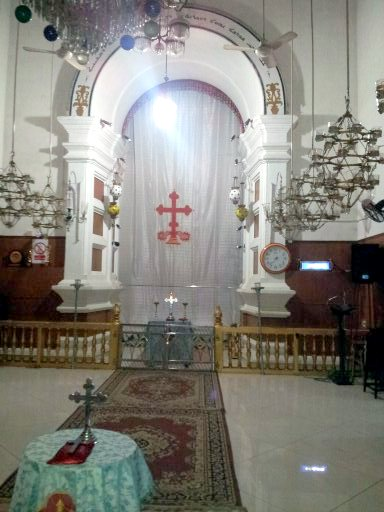
Inside view of Thrissur Marth Mariam Big church

Marth Mariam Cathedral is the cathedral of the Chaldean Syrian Church of India, part of the Assyrian Church of the East. It is located in Thrissur City in the state of Kerala, India. It is the city's first Christian church inside the fort gates.

The church established in 1814 by Sakthan Thampuran, the maharajah of Cochin, for the Pazhayakoottukar (Ancient Indian Christian community) whom he invited to live in Thrissur to strengthen the trade sector of the new city.

A group supporting Chaldean Catholic bishop Elias Mellus was based in Our Lady of Dolours. They eventually broke with the Catholic hierarchy and formed the Chaldean Syrian Church which is part of the universal Assyrian Church of the East. They retained the Our Lady of Dolours building, but renamed it Mart Mariam. Mart Mariam church, Thrissur now serves as the cathedral of the Chaldean Syrian Church of India which is part of the universal Assyrian Church of the East.

== See also ==
- List of cathedrals in India

== Sources ==
- "The Church Of The East - India". churchoftheeastindia.org. Archived from the original on 5 June 2014.
- "Indian Christianity". indianchristianity.org. Archived from the original on 14 July 2014.
