= Thoma Darmo =

Catholicos-Patriarch of the Ancient Church of the East from 1968 to 1969

His Holiness Mar Thoma II Darmo
- Catholicos Patriarch of the Ancient Church of the East
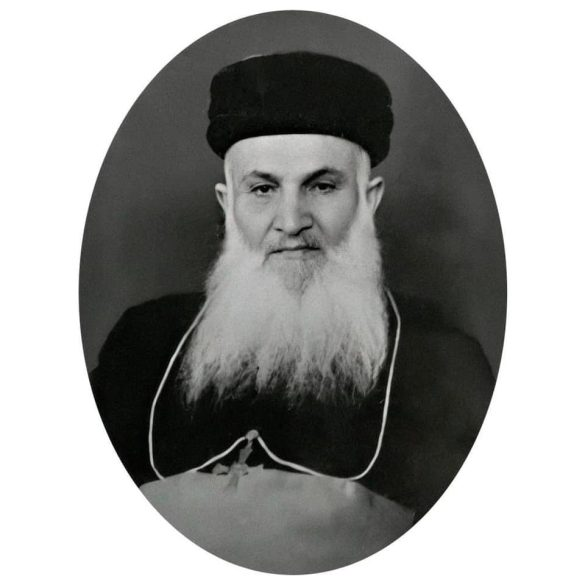
- His Holiness Mar Thoma II Darmo
- Church: Ancient Church of the East
- See: Apostolic See of Seleucia-Ctesiphon
- Installed: 11 October 1968
- Term ended: 7 September 1969
- Successor: Mar Addai II
- Previous posts: Metropolitan of India (June 1952 – October 1968)

Orders
- Ordination: 11 October 1968 at St. Zaia Cathedral (Baghdad, Iraq)
- Rank: Catholicos-Patriarch

Personal details
- Born: Mansour Darmo; September 21, 1904 Iyel, Ottoman Empire
- Died: September 7, 1969 (aged 64) Baghdad, Ba'athist Iraq
- Denomination: Ancient Church of the East
- Parents: Elishai Darmo (father) and Shirine Darmo (mother)
- Occupation: Clergy

Thoma Darmo (21 September 1904 – 7 September 1969) was the Catholicos-Patriarch of the Ancient Church of the East, from 1968 to 1969. Prior to that, he served as Metropolitan of India, from 1952 to 1964, within the Church of the East.

== Church of the East ==
Thoma Darmo was born as Mansour Darmo, son of Elisha and Shirine. He spent his childhood in Turkey and from 1919 in Iraq, becoming an ordained clergyman in 1921. He continued to serve in Iraq for 15 years. Then he moved to Syria where he served from 1936 to 1952.

In June 1952, he was assigned as Metropolitan of India, based at Trichur (Kerala), and thus became one of senior hierarchs of the Church of the East. He built a number of churches and established a number of new dioceses in India, encouraged the preparation of new clergy and established the Mar Narsai Press. In January 1964, he was suspended from the metropolitan office by Patriarch Shimun XXI Eshai.

== Ancient Church of the East ==
Subsequently, after three years of the seat of the Ancient Church of the East remaining vacant (1964–1967), Mar Thoma Darmo was elected as Catholicos-Patriarch in October 1968.

He relocated the Ancient Church of the East to Baghdad where the church is headquartered. He died the following year on 7 September 1969. He was succeeded in 1970 by Catholicos-Patriarch Mar Addai II.

== Aftermath ==
In 1995, under new Patriarch Dinkha IV of the rival Assyrian Church of the East, reconciliation between fractions in India was achieved, and on that occasion the validity of ordinations performed by Thoma Darmo after the suspension of 1964 was recognized, and in 1997 the suspension itself was annulled by the Holy Synod of the Assyrian Church of the East.

== Sources ==
- Mooken, Aprem (1974). Mar Thoma Darmo: A Biography. Trichur: Mar Narsai Press.
- Mooken, Aprem (2003). The History of the Assyrian Church of the East in the Twentieth Century. Kottayam: St. Ephrem Ecumenical Research Institute.
- Mooken, Aprem (2004). Patriarch Mar Dinkha IV: The Man and His Message. Trichur: Mar Narsai Press.

Preceded by (none)	Catholicos-Patriarch of the Ancient Church of the East; 1968–1969	Succeeded by Addai II Giwargis
