= Ancient Church of the East =

Eastern Christian denomination

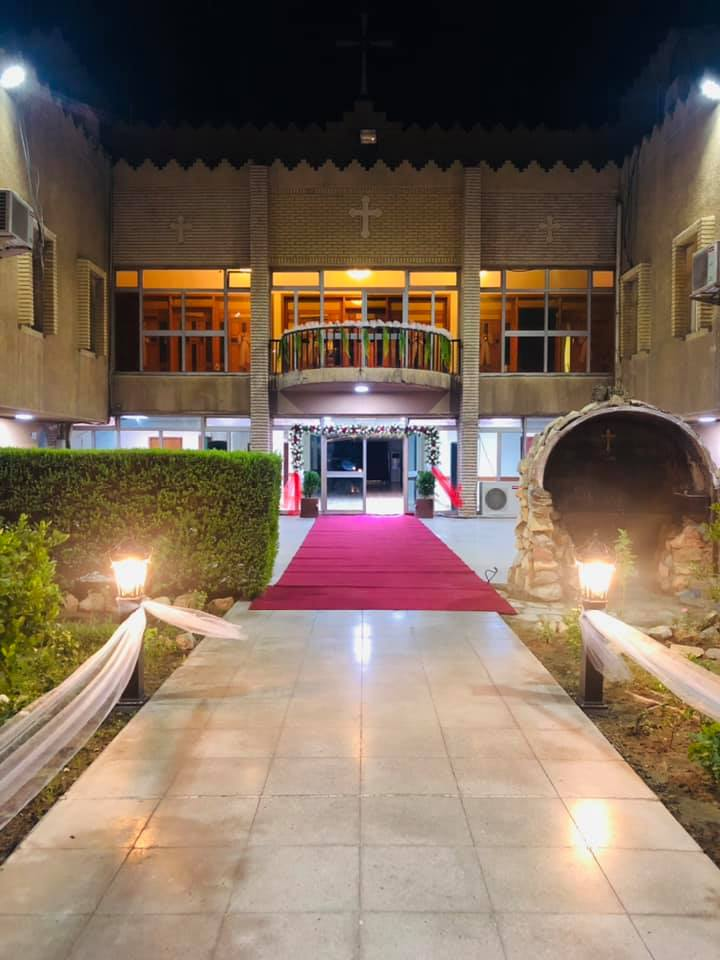
- Cathedral of the Virgin Mary; Baghdad, Iraq
- Abbreviation: ACE
- Classification: Christian
- Orientation: Syriac
- Catholicos-Patriarch: Gewargis III Younan
- Language: Syriac
- Liturgy: East Syriac Rite
- Headquarters: Baghdad, Iraq
- Separated from: Assyrian Church of the East
- Members: approx. 75,000, of which 45,000 are in Iraq and 20,000 in India (1999)

The Ancient Church of the East (ACE) is an East Syriac Christian denomination based in Baghdad and is composed largely of ethnic Assyrians. It separated from the Assyrian Church of the East in 1964 to establish an independent ecclesial communion, and is one of the churches that descend from historic Church of the East, alongside the Assyrian Church of the East, the Chaldean Catholic Church, and the Syro-Malabar Catholic Church. In 1999, the church reported 75,000 members. As of 2020, according to the World Christian Database, the online version of the World Christian Encyclopedia, published by Edinburgh University Press, the Ancient Church of the East has approximately 11,890 members.

== History ==
In 1964, a decision by Patriarch Mar Shimun XXIII Eshai of the Assyrian Church of the East to switch over from the traditional Julian calendar to the Gregorian calendar led part of the Church of the East, to split off in a schism. The breakaway group called itself the Ancient Church of the East and in 1968 consecrated their own patriarch, Mar Toma Darmo, who strongly opposed the system of hereditary succession of the position of patriarch of the Church of the East, as well as its adoption of the Gregorian calendar "and other modernizing measures". Mar Darmo was also joined by "various other groups opposed to Mar Shimun."

Mar Yacob III Daniel was elected as new patriarch in June 2022. However, he abdicated two months later in August 2022, and on 12 November 2022 the Holy Synod elected Mar Gewargis Younan to take his place. The consecration of the patriarch-elect was scheduled to take place in Baghdad in June 2023, and on 9 June, Mar Gewargis III Younan was consecrated as the 110th Patriarch of the Ancient Church of The East.

== Organisation ==
=== Holy Synod ===
The Holy Synod is listed as follow:

- Mar Gewargis III Younan, Catholicos-Patriarch (seat in Baghdad, Iraq)
- Mar Yacob Daniel, Metropolitan of the Archdiocese of Baghdad and Basra (seat in Baghdad and Basra)
- Mar Zaia Khoshaba, Metropolitan of the Archdiocese of Canada and the United States (seat in Toronto, Canada)
- Mar Toma Aramia, Metropolitan who resides in Canada (seat in Toronto, Canada)
- Mar Shimun Daniel Alkhoury, Bishop of Iraq and the Middle East.

== List of catholicos-patriarchs ==
=== Since 1968 ===
- Thoma Darmo (1968–1969)
- Addai II Giwargis (1972–2022)
- Yacob III Daniel (June - August 2022)
- Gewargis III Younan (9 June 2023 – present)

== Relationship with the Assyrian Church of the East ==
Under the tenure of Addai II, the Ancient Church of the East has made several gestures towards reunification with the Assyrian Church of the East. The most prominent of these is the declaration made in June 2010 stating that the Ancient Church of the East would now celebrate Christmas in accordance with the Gregorian calendar. Previously, the church used the traditional Julian date for the Christmas Day (25 December of the Julian calendar currently corresponds to 7 January of the Gregorian Calendar), as the Church of the East had throughout its history. The decision was to be implemented later that year, on 25 December 2010.

=== Dialogue for reunification ===
Following the death (March 2015) of Dinkha IV, Catholicos-Patriarch of the Assyrian Church of the East, dialogue of unification continued between the churches.

On 22 May 2015, a meeting involving prelates of both Holy Councils took place in Chicago, Illinois, in the library of St. Andrew's Assyrian Church of the East. Present were Yacoub Daniel, Zaia Khoshaba, and Gewargis Younan representing the Ancient Church of the East, and Gewargis Sliwa, Awa Royel, and Iskhaq Yousif representing the Assyrian Church of the East. Archdeacon William Toma served as the meeting's common secretary. Yacoub Daniel flew in from Australia for the meeting, and Zaia traveled from Canada.

On 1 June 2015, the Holy Synod of the Assyrian Church of the East met in Erbil, Iraq, to discuss the future of the church. The date had previously been arranged for the election of the new Catholicos-Patriarch. Awa Royel issued a statement on the same day, notifying the public that a response to the Ancient Church of the East's recommendations for reunification had been delivered to their prelates. The letter requested a prompt response to the terms, and the election of the new Patriarch was suspended until the following week, on 8 June 2015.

On 5 June 2015, Aprem Mooken issued a formal statement announcing that the election of the next Catholicos-Patriarch of the Assyrian Church of the East was suspended until September (2015), pending the unification of the churches.

It turned out that unification was not achievable. On 18 September, Assyrian Church of the East elected Gewargis III as the new head of the Church, and he was consecrated and enthroned as Catholicos-Patriarch on 27 September 2015.

In spite of the fact that unification was not achieved, leaders of both Churches have continued to promote various forms of mutual cooperation.

After the death of Mar Addai II, reunification failed in May 2022 and the election of a new patriarch was therefore launched.

== See also ==
- Assyrian people
- Chaldean Catholic Church
- Chaldean Syrian Church
- Church of the East
- East Syrian Rite
- Old Calendarists
