= Joseph J. Palackal =

Syro-malabar priest and musicologist

Joseph J. Palackal, C.M.I. (born in Palackal family at Pallippuram, near Cherthala in Alappuzha, Kerala) is an Indic musicologist, singer and composer, with special interests in the musical traditions of the Indian Christians and a Syro-Malabar Catholic priest. He is also the Founder-President of the Christian Musicological Society of India.

== Education ==
Palackal studied Hindustani classical music (vocal) under N. V. Patwardhan, graduating from the Maharaja Sayajirao University of Baroda; he holds degrees in Christian theology and psychology, the latter with a Gold medal from the Faculty of Arts of M. S. University, and held a National Merit Scholarship.

Palackal wrote a Master's thesis at Hunter College in 1995 on the various styles of singing the Puthenpaana [New Song], the Malayalam poem composed by the grammarian and lexicographer Johann Ernst Hanxleden (Arnos Paathiri), analysing the several cultural influences.

He did his theological studies at Pontifical Athenaeum Dharmaram Vidya Kshetram and during that time he also studied at Christ University.

He wrote a doctoral thesis in ethnomusicology at the Graduate Center of the City University of New York in 2005 on Syriac (Aramaic) chant traditions in South India, studying on the one hand the contemporary practice of model melodies of the East-Syriac/Chaldean rite of the Syro-Malabar Church, and, on the other hand, the oktoechos of the West Syriac Rite of the Oriental Orthodox Churches of South India.

As part of this doctoral work, Palackal brought out a CD, Qambel Maran, a collection of Syriac chants in the Chaldean tradition of the Syro-Malabar Church; it includes the hymn Awun d'wasmayya, i.e., the Lord's Prayer in Aramaic, arguably in the same words which were used by Jesus when he taught the Pater Noster, compositions by St. Ephrem the Syrian (notably the acrostic hymn Iso maaran m'siha on the name Iso M'siha, i.e., Jesus the Messiah), and the Syriac translation Sabbah lesan of the Latin hymn Pange Lingua by St. Thomas Aquinas; these chants had up to then been preserved in the main only in oral tradition; among the singers is Fr. Abel Periyappuram, the founder of the Kalabhavan and the key in the transition of the Syro-Malabar liturgy from Syriac (Aramaic) to Malayalam.

== Academic career ==
He was, for a time, dean of studies at the Kalabhavan under Abel Periyappuram.

Palackal published several research papers on music in English and Malayalam. As a consequence, he was invited to write articles on Indian Christian music in the New Grove Dictionary of Music and Musicians and in the Garland Encyclopedia of World Music; neither encyclopaedia had dealt with the topic before.

He also published illustrations of various facets of their music, culture, and history; these include the picture of an angel playing a five-stringed violin as carved on the wooden altar of St. Mary's Forane Church, Pallippuram, the iconic portrait of Christ the Guru drawn by Joy Elamkunnapuzha, and the picture of the granite Cross(c. 700 A. D.) at St. Thomas Mount, Chennai, the earliest available material evidence for a flourishing Christian community in India.

== Film ==
Palackal wrote the script for the documentary film Kerala: the Cradle of Christianity in South Asia produced by the Christian Musicological Society of India, the Carmelites of Mary Immaculate, and the Department of Tourism, Government of Kerala. The screenplay was by Jain Joseph, who also directed. According to reviewer Rolf Groesbeck, the film "summarize[s], for a partly nonspecialist audience, much of [Palackal's] work" on the ethnomusicology of the churches of Kerala.

== Music ==
Palackal is the lead vocalist for about 40 works in Malayalam, Hindi, Sanskrit, English, and Aramaic (Syriac). He brought out in 1979 an LP record, Christian Bhajans, as part of an experiment under the aegis of Mar Cardinal Joseph Parecattil to devise a liturgy founded on the Indian musical tradition. Another work is a semi-classical rendering of the Sanskrit poem Kristusahasṟanāmam [The Thousand Names of Christ] by the engineer and philologist I. C. Chacko, Illiparambil. He made his New York debut in 1990 with a guest appearance singing a Christian devotional song in Hindi in the off-Broadway show Nunsense; later performance venues include Lincoln Center for the Performing Arts and Princeton University.

== Ministry ==
In June 2019, Plackal became a full time parochial vicar at the Latin Church St. Margaret Roman Catholic Church in Middle Village, Queens. He had previously been a parochial vicar at St. Stanislaus Kostaka Church in Maspeth, Queens, where he served for more than two decades.

== Personal ==
Palackal hails from the family of Palackal Thoma Malpan, the senior founder of the Carmelites of Mary Immaculate, a monastic order which has worked to preserve the musical traditions of Indian Christianity, and grew up in the musical traditions of the Syro-Malabar Church.
