= Palackal =

Palackal is the family name of the Palackal family in Kerala, India. People with the name include:

- Palackal Thoma (c. 1780–1841), Indian Catholic priest, founder of the Carmelites of Mary Immaculate
- Joseph J. Palackal (fl. from 2005), Indic musicologist, singer, and composer
