= Darsanalaya Ashram =

Christian ashram

- With the People for Goodness
- Formation: 1996
- Type: Mission Centre
- Purpose: Indian Christianity
- Region served: Archdiocese of Delhi
- Patron: Blessed Chavara
- Congregation: CMI (Carmelites of Mary Immaculate)
- Management: Darsanalaya Society

Darsanalaya is an Indian Christian ashram under the territory of Archdiocese of Delhi and belongs to one of the mission centers of S H Province of CMI Congregation. Action in Contemplation is the concept of Darsanalaya Ashram. Darsanalaya Ashram is committed to the Vision ‘With the People for Goodness’ and Mission to ‘Create Equality, Solidarity and Friendship among People’.

== History ==
SH Province acquired about 10 acres (40,000 m^{2}) of land in 1996 to set up a mission (Catholic missions) centre at Chandpur Village of Faridabad District, Haryana.

== Overview ==
Darsanalaya Ashram started with the same spirit of Jesus Christ and Blessed Chavara. It is an Indian Christian Ashram for the search and social reformation in collaboration with other religions and religious sects.

== Location ==
Darsanalaya Ashram is located in a village area on the banks of the Yamuna River. It is in a village called Chandpur, at 28.323049°N 77.457457°E and about 20 km away from Faridabad city of Haryana state in India. It is bounded by the National Capital Territory of Delhi National Capital Territory of Delhi on its north, Gurgaon Gurgaon District on the west, and Uttar Pradesh Uttar Pradesh State on its east across the Yamuna River. There are around 27 villages around this ashram.

Darsanalaya Ashram

Darsanalaya Ashram

== Ethnic diversity ==
The village population consists of different castes and traditions. The main classes of people in this area are Jats, Rajputs, Brahmins, Ahirs, Banias, Harijans and Gujars. Almost all belong to agricultural communities. There are also categories like village artisans, craftsmen and certain other menials who helped in the agricultural operations. These included the village blacksmith, the carpenter, the oil man, the barber, the washer man, the village potter and some others.

== Activities ==
Activities of Darsanalaya Ashram are governed by the registered body of the Darsanalaya Society, which is a Charitable Society registered under the Societies Registration Act, XXI of 1860 (Reg. No. S-55211 of 2006) by the Darsanalaya Ashram with a view to plan, organize, unify and implement socio-economic, educational and healthcare activities of the Darsanalaya Ashram. The all-round welfare of those who depend on agriculture, the working class, the poor and the indigent, irrespective of caste, creed or religion is the goal of the society.

The society is involved in different types of awareness programs through art and media, especially on HIV/AIDS discrimination and its stigma, sex imbalance, abortion, poverty, and sexual abuse, and trying to promote value-based education in rural and urban areas, religious harmony etc. The society is involved in medical promotion through giving awareness training and treating people with different types of herbs. It is also involved in the construction of a new generation through classes, and academic support to children. It is actively involved in inter-religious and ecumenical programs.

=== Institute ===
Darsanalaya Institute of Alternative Medicines and Research is an innovation of Darsanalaya Society and it is for promotion and research on herbal medicines. It has affiliated with the Indian Board of Alternative Medicines. As part of the propagation of healing power of herbal medicines, it arranges training programs in the Institute and in different states in association with local NGOs and government agencies.

=== Arogyalaya ===
Darsana Arogalaya is a 15-bedded Arogalaya (hospital) where an herbal system of medicine (Sheethali Chikithsa) is practiced. People from different parts of the country and abroad visit the Arogalaya for treatment. It has consulting centers in different parts of the country.

=== Navadarsan ===
The inspiration for Nava Darsan is from the words of APJ Abdul Kalam, former President of India.

"Dream, Dream, Dream
Dreams transform into thoughts
And thoughts result in action" (Ignited Minds, P.1)

The idea of the Nava Darsan (New Vision), value-added education program originates from the group discussion of experts in the field of academics, social scientists, social workers, educators, artists, film directors, politicians and principals of CBSE schools. The discussion resulted in formulating the objectives for the Nava Darshan Education Program.

The aims and objectives of the Nava Darshan Education Program:

- To promote value based classes.
- To give clear cut sex education.
- To find out the leadership qualities of the children.
- To create a stage for interaction and to widen their world.
- To create a sensitive generation for the future.
- To shape the youngsters into persons with a strong character and outgoing personality.
- To give dreams for the youngsters.
- To find out the talents of students.
- To provide counseling, yoga Training, and Meditation techniques to the children to reduce the stress and to increase the concentration and meaning in life.
- To make a better rapport between the parents, teachers and children.
- To conduct animation programs for teachers and parents through the schools.

There are thousands of schools in government and private sectors. Years of experience with the students and parents made a few issues clear, related to this field. Stress among the students, identity crisis, broken family relationships, emotionally imbalanced teachers, the aimless life etc. were a few burning issues of study findings.

The society sponsors over a hundred brilliant and poor children from the villages. It is not only to provide a little financial support, but to give formation to these children though seminars, talent shows, sports and games etc. Darsanalaya provides sponsorship to one hundred and thirty students for their studies from 13 schools around the Ashram. Nava Darshan aspirants have regular get-togethers, classes, seminars, sport and literary competitions etc.
