= Kuriakose Elias Chavara =

Indian Carmelite and religious founder

Saint Kuriakose Elias Chavara CMI
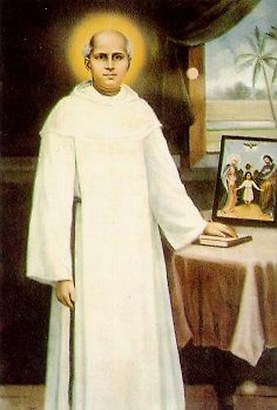
- Kuriakose Chavara
- Born: 10 February 1805; Kainakary, Kuttanad, Travancore (present-day Alappuzha district, Kerala, India)
- Died: 3 January 1871 (aged 65); Koonammavu, Kingdom of Cochin, British Raj (present-day Ernakulam district, Kerala, India)
- Venerated in: Catholic Church
- Beatified: 8 February 1986, Kottayam by Pope John Paul II
- Canonized: 23 November 2014, Rome by Pope Francis
- Major shrine: St. Joseph's Church, Mannanam, St.Philomena's Forane Church, Koonammavu
- Feast: 18 February (Roman Latin Catholic Church) 3 January (Syro-Malabar Church)
- Influences: Palackal Thoma

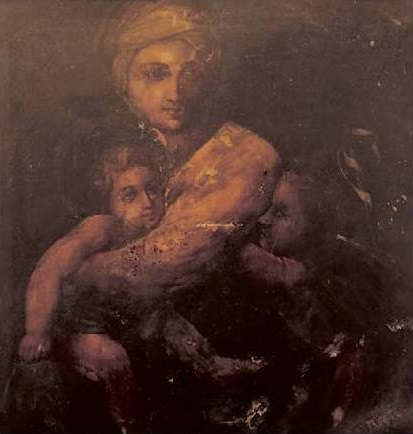
Marth Mariam and Infant Jesus, accompanied by John the Baptist from Peshitta. Painting of Ravi Varma found at Mannanam.

Saint Kuriakose Elias Chavara, CMI (10 February 1805 – 3 January 1871) was an Indian Catholic priest, religious, philosopher and social reformer. He is the first canonised Catholic male saint of Indian origin and was a member of the Syro-Malabar Church, an Eastern Catholic church. He was the co-founder and first Prior General of the Carmelites of Mary Immaculate (CMI), the first religious congregation for men in the Syro-Malabar Church. The Congregation of the Mother of Carmel (CMC), originally known as the Third Order of Discalced Carmelites (TOCD), was founded by St Kuriakose Elias Chavara in 1866 in Kerala.

== Early life ==
Kuriakose Elias Chavara was born on 10 February 1805 at Kainakary, Kerala in a Nasrani Christian family as the son of Iko (Kuriakose) Chavara and Mariam Thoppil. Nasranis are Saint Thomas Christians (also known as Syriac Christians) who trace their lineage to the ancient Christians of Kerala baptised by Thomas the Apostle. The name Kuriakose is derived from the Syriac Aramaic name ܩܘܪܝܩܘܣ (Quriaqos). He was baptised on 18 February 1805 at St. Joseph's Syro-Malabar Catholic Church, Chennamkary. On 8 September 1805, Chavara was dedicated to Blessed Virgin Mary at St. Mary's Church, Vechoor. The Chavara family has derived from the ancient Nasrani family Meenappally in Kainakary.

In his childhood, Kuriakose attended the village school. There he studied language and elementary sciences. He entered the seminary in 1818 in Pallipuram where Palackal Thoma Malpan was the Rector. He was ordained a priest on 29 November 1829 and celebrated first Holy Qurbana at St. Andrew's Basilica, Arthunkal, Alappuzha. His special intention during the first Holy Qurabana was the realization of the religious institute which was being contemplated by Palackal Thomas Malpan, Porukara Thomas Kathanar, Brother Jacob Kaniathara and himself.

== Later life ==
Kuriakose Elias Chavara joined with two other priests, Palackal Thoma Malpan and Porukara Thoma Kathanar to lead a monastic life. The name of the community they founded was Servants of Mary Immaculate. The foundation for the first monastery at Mannanam was laid on 11 May 1831 by Porukara Thomas Kathanar. Palackal Malpan and Porukara Kathanar died in 1841 and 1846 respectively. On 8 December 1855, Kuriakose Elias Chavara and ten other priests took vows in the Carmelite tradition. He was nominated as the Prior General of Mannanam monastery. The congregation became affiliated as a Third Order institute of the Discalced Carmelites. From that point on they used the postnominal initials of TOCD.

== Social reformer ==
Kuriakose Elias Chavara initiated reforms in the Kerala society much before Narayana Guru (1853) Chattambi Swamikal (1853) and Vakkom Abdul Khadar Maulavi (1854). Though he hailed from a Syriac Christian family, which occupied a higher social status, he played a major role in educating and uplifting people especially of the lower ranks of society.

=== Education ===
Kuriakose Chavara started an institution for Sanskrit studies at Mannanam in 1846. A tutor belonging to the Variar community was brought from Thrissur, to teach at this Sanskrit institution. After establishing the Sanskrit institution in Mannanam, Chavara took the initiative to start a school in a nearby village called Arpookara. On this Parappurath Varkey wrote in the Chronicles of the Mannanam monastery: “While the work on the Mannanam School began, a place on the Arpookara Thuruthumali hill was located to build a Chapel and school for the converts from the Pulaya caste." Chavara was the first Indian who not only dared to admit the untouchables to schools but also provided them with Sanskrit education which was forbidden to the lower castes, thereby challenging social bans based on caste, as early as the former part of the 19th century.

In 1856, Archbishop Bernardine Baccinelli issued a pastoral letter directing that each parish should establish an educational institution, with noncompliance potentially resulting in exclusion from the sacraments.[citation needed] This directive contributed to the widespread establishment of parish-based schools in Kerala, which came to be commonly known as Pallikudams (schools attached to churches).[5][14] While there is no direct evidence that Kuriakose Elias Chavara initiated this circular, he played an important role in its implementation. As the Prior of the Carmelites of Mary Immaculate (CMI), he actively encouraged his congregation to support parish-level education and ensured that nearby monasteries oversaw these initiatives.[15][14]

==== Midday meal ====
Kuriakose Chavara knew that the schools he started in Mannanam and Arpookara would be successful if the poor students especially dalits were given midday meals. It was his original idea. It inspired Sir C P Ramaswamy Iyer to recommend this to King for being implemented in all government run schools. This practice is continued even today in government schools in India.

==== Pidiyari ====
Kuriakose Chavara started a charity practice known as Pidiyari (a handful of rice) to encourage people to make daily small donations to help the needy. The Pidyari scheme supported the Midday meal Kuriakose Chavara popularized in schools. The Pidiyari scheme was implemented in the following way: Participants would daily set aside a small quantity of rice in a special collection pot. The rice collected would be brought to Church during the weekends and was used to feed the poor, especially students for midday meal. A pious organization was formed by Kuriakose Chavara called “Unnimishihayude Dharma Sabha” who took care of the Pidiyari collection.

=== Printing press ===
Kuriakose Chavara started St. Joseph's Press at Mannanam in 1846, which was the third printing press in Kerala and the first press founded by a Malayali without the help of foreigners. From this printing press came the oldest existing Malayalam newspaper in circulation Nasrani Deepika.

== Service to the Church ==
Kuriakose Elias Chavara introduced retreat preaching for the laity for the first time in the Kerala Church. He popularised devotions and piety exercises such as rosary, way of the cross and eucharistic adoration. He was the Vicar General of Syriac Rite Catholics in 1861 in order to counter the influence of Mar Thomas Rochos on Saint Thomas Christians.

== Congregations founded ==
=== CMI Congregation ===
In co-operation with Palackal Thoma Malpan and Thoma Porukara, Kuriakose Elias Chavara founded an Indian religious congregation for men, now known as the Carmelites of Mary Immaculate. Chavara took religious vows on 8 December 1855 and took the name of Kuriakose Elias of the Holy Family.

Kuriakose Elias Chavara was the Prior General of all the monasteries of the congregation from 1856 till his death in 1871. He was commonly called under the name 'Common Prior'. The activities of the members of CMI congregation under the leadership of Chavara created huge transformation in the society. This made priests and people to request Chavara to open religious houses in their area. He established seven new monasteries besides Mannanam. They are Koonammavu-1857, Elthuruth-(St. Aloysius College, Thrissur)1858, Plasnal-1858, Vazhakulam-1859, Pulincunnu-1861, Ambazhakad-1868, and Mutholy-1870. In 1864, The Vicar Apostolic transferred St. Chavara to Koonammavu Monastery.

=== Carmelite Congregation for Women ===
On 13 February 1866, the first Carmelite convent for women was established at Koonammavu under the name Third Order of the Discalced Carmelites (TOCD). While Kuriakose Elias Chavara played a supportive role in promoting women's religious life, the founding of the TOCD (now known as the Congregation of the Teresian Carmelites, CTC) has been officially attributed to Mother Eliswa Vakayil. On 14 April 2025, the Dicastery for the Causes of Saints, with the approval of Pope Francis, promulgated a decree recognizing her as the foundress:

“The miracle attributed to the intercession of the Venerable Servant of God Eliswa of the Blessed Virgin Mary (née Eliswa Vakayil), founder of the Congregation of the Third Order of the Discalced Carmelites, now the Teresian Carmelite Nuns…”^{[1]}

The Congregation of the Mother of Carmel (CMC) continues to recognize the historical contributions of Chavara for all his support to the congregation, while the CTC congregation identifies Mother Eliswa as its sole foundress.

Kuriakose Elias Chavara strongly desired the establishment of a women’s religious congregation in the Malabar Church. He considered the absence of convents for women a “pathetic situation” and hoped for a space where girls could receive spiritual instruction, become good Christians, and contribute to society through education and virtue. He offered support and spiritual direction to those pursuing such a vision.

His close associate and confessor, Fr. Leopold Beccaro, noted Chavara’s enthusiasm and administrative support in helping organize the early steps of the congregation. However, the Dicastery for the Causes of Saints, in a decree approved by Pope Francis on 14 April 2025, officially recognized Mother Eliswa Vakayil as the founder of the Congregation of the Third Order of the Discalced Carmelites (TOCD), now known as the Congregation of the Teresian Carmelites (CTC). While Chavara was a significant supporter, the canonical designation of foundress is now formally attributed to Mother Eliswa.

== Writings ==
All the literary works of Kuriakose Chavara were written between 1829 and 1870. The literary writings of Kuriakose Chavara are unique in two aspects. First, it reflects the religious spiritualism of Christianity. Second, even after a century after the Kuriakose Chavara wrote, there are limited number of literary works with reference to Christianity.

The writings of Kuriakose Elias Chavara can be divided generally into following categories during the namely:

- Chronics and historical writings
- Spiritual writings
- Letters
- Prayer Texts
- Writings on Liturgy
- Writings related to administration

=== Chronicles and historical writings ===
The Chronicles (Nalagamangal) narrates the daily events not only of the monastery but also of the society. These writings were originally found in Malayalam, in Kuriakose Chavara's own handwriting. There are two manuscripts under the title 'Mannanam Nalagamangal.' Together with the events of the CMI Congregation the chronicles depict events associated with the Society and Kerala Church of that time. The book 'Complete Works of Chavara', Vol. 1 published in 1990 contains five Chronicles.

=== Spiritual writings ===
==== Atmanuthapam (The lamentations of a Repentant Soul) ====
It is an autobiographical poem written in epic style – Mahakavyam (Mahakavya). The poem gives life to life of Jesus from birth to ascension into heaven and life of Mary from ascension of Jesus to assumption of Mary into heaven. The uniqueness of the poem is that Kuriakose Chavara brings his own life experiences from childhood.

According to Dr. K.M. Tharakan Atmanuthapam reflects Kuriakose Chavara's philosophy of life which in turn exemplifies a Christian religious life. Dr. Tharakan states, "...Humility, which is not self-contempt, and repentance are the foundation stones of the philosophy of his life. Thus the first step is faith in God. The second is the belief that one can reach God through Jesus Christ. The third is the conviction that without repenting and accepting Jesus, one cannot reach Christ... what a Christian obtains is the awareness of the noble qualities. These qualities are 'faith', 'hope' and 'love'. Only through these triple qualities, a Christian can attain Christ."

==== Maranaveetil Cholvanulla Parvam (A poem to be sung in the bereaved house) ====
It is intended to be sung when the corpus is placed in the coffin for public homage. The poem contains 1162 verses. The underlying message is that one should lead a virtuous and God-fearing life in order overcome the painful experience of death. The articles of faith related to the death of a man are enumerated and beautifully illustrated with stories or incidents, the poet heard or read.

==== Nalla Appante Chavarul (Testament of a Loving Father) ====
It is the counsel to the Christian Families of Kainakari parish but its relevance to the families resonates till date. This insightful and down-to-earth document is the first of its kind in the known history of the Church, offers practical direction to families in leading a God-fearing as well as socially commendable life.

==== Anastasiayude Rakthasakshyam (The martyrdom of Anastacia) ====
It contains 232 verses.

==== Dhyana Sallapangal (Colloquies in meditation) ====
Dhyana Sallapangal consists of the reflective meditative notes of Kuriakose Chavara.

==== Eclogues (Shepherd Plays) ====
They were the first dramatic plays in Malayalam in the pastoral (shepherd) genre or Eclogues of Italy. They were plays written for being performed during the Christmas season. Kuriakose Chavara wrote it between 1856 – 1858. He wrote 10 Eclogues (Shepherd Plays) and introduced them in the novitiate at Koonammavu Seminary.

The first Indian drama is Neeldarpan, published in 1860 and is written in Bengali by Dinabandhu Mitra on the miseries of the indigo cultivators. The first Malayalam play is considered Abhinjana Shakuntalam, translated into Malayalam by Kerala Verma Valiakovil Thampuran in 1882. Kuriakose Chavara wrote the 10 eclogues or liturgical dramas decades before. He could be considered the father of Malayalam drama.

=== Letters ===
These letters were written on different occasions to various persons or groups. There are 67 original copies of these letters. These letters are published in 'Complete Works of Chavara' Vol.IV. The chronicle in Koonammavu records three letters written to them by Kuriakose Elias Chavara. Even though the Chronicle states many letters and notes were written by Chavara, only three are recorded.

=== Prayer texts ===
Even though Kuriakose Chavara wrote many prayer texts only six of them have been preserved. They are: i) Meditation: method of beginning – Meditation: method of beginning is an intercessory prayer to mother Mary seeking help to be with him during the meditation. ii) Prayer to the Blessed virgin Mary. Thanksgiving prayer to the blessings that received from mother Mary. iii) Morning Prayer to Most Holy Trinity – Thanksgiving prayer for the favours received. iv) Evening prayer to Most Holy Trinity – Thanksgiving prayer for the favours received. v) Prayer for custody of eyes – Prayers to be recited by priests to remain rooted in their fidelity to Jesus Christ. vi) Prayer to be recited by priests – Prayers to be recited by priests to remain rooted in their fidelity to Jesus Christ.

=== Writings on Liturgy ===
Kuriakose Chavara wrote a number of liturgical texts that played an important role in reforming liturgy. They include the Divine office for priests, Divine office for the dead, office of the Blessed virgin Mary, prayers of various blessings, the order of Holy mass – Tukasa, liturgical calendar, forty hours adoration and prayer books for lay man.

=== Writings related to administration ===
In this category there are 16 writings that has been preserved. Some of these are written on palm leaves and others on paper. It deals with matters pertaining to administrative matters pertaining to the time of Chavara.

== Prior Mango ==
Prior Mango (പ്രിയോർ മാങ്ങ) is a variety of mango which Kuriakose Chavara popularised. It is named after him who was endearingly called “Prior” based on his position as the Prior or head of the religious congregation. At Mannanam monastery there was a mango tree which was planted and taken care of by Kuriakose Chavara. He sent the mango seedlings to monasteries and convents and told the members: Please plant the sapling of this sweet mango, which I name it as ‘Dukran’ (Orma = memory) in each of our monastery. "This is to make you realize that myself and all men are weak and faltering and don’t have long life even as these mango trees which give sweet fruits." In a letter he wrote: " This Mango-tree (1870) and its seedlings leave a loving patrimonial memory for us" It is because of the association of Carmelite Prior Kuriakose Chavara that this variety of mango came to be known all over Kerala as "Priormavu" (the mango tree of the Prior). Prior Mango is considered as one of the premium variety of mangoes in Kerala and is often exported to its neighbouring south Indian states. He also planted prior mango tree in koonammav at St: philominas church backyard. The tree still stands and bears fruit throughout the year.

== Death ==
Kuriakose Elias Chavara died on 3 January 1871, aged 65, at Koonammavu. He was buried in St.Philomena's Forane Church, Koonammavu Although some sources claim that his body was later moved to St. Joseph’s Monastery Church in Mannanam, there are no official records at St. Philomena’s Church or in the Verapoly Archdiocese confirming such a transfer. His memorial is celebrated on 3 January as per the Syro-Malabar liturgical calendar. whereas his memorial is celebrated on 18 February as per the Roman Liturgical Calendar of the Latin Rite.

The following were the last words of Kuriakose Chavara: “Why are you sad? All God’s people must die some day. My hour has come. By the grace of God, I prepared myself for it since long.” Showing a picture of the Holy Family, he continued, "My parents taught me to keep the Holy Family always in my mind and to honour them throughout my life. As I had always the protection of the Holy Family I can tell you with confidence that I have never lost the baptismal grace I received in baptism. I dedicate our little Congregation and each of you to the Holy Family. Always rely on Jesus, Mary and Joseph. Let the Holy Family reign in your hearts. Don’t be sad about my dying. Joyfully submit yourselves to the will of God. God is all powerful and His blessings are countless. God will provide you with a new Prior who will be a source of blessing for the Congregation as well as for you. Hold fast to the constitution, the rules of our elders and that of the Church. Love our Lord Jesus in the Blessed Sacrament with all your heart. Draw the waters of eternal life from that fountain as in the words of the Prophet Elijah. All the members of the congregation, especially elders must be charitable to one another. If you do so, God will be glorified by the congregation and which will be flourished day after day. Your charity will bring salvation to souls."

== Miracles ==
Scores of miraculous favours were reported by the intercession of Kuriakose Chavara. Alphonsa of the Immaculate Conception, who later became the first saint of India, has testified in 1936 that Kuriakose Elias Chavara had appeared to her twice during her illness and relieved her suffering. Alphonsa had a holy relic of Chavra's hair which was taken by one of his disciples Varkey Muttathupadathu and which she believed allowed her to pray to Kuriakose Chavara and receive miraculous cure. The relic is now preserved in Mannanam.

=== Beatification ===
The miracle which Rome approved for the beatification of Kuriakose Chavara was the cure of the congenital deformity of the legs (clubfoot) of Joseph Mathew Pennaparambil happened in April 1960. Joseph was born club-footed with congenital deformity of both the legs. On hearing that many miracles have happened through the intercession of Kuriakose Chavara, Joseph and his family started praying. They prayed almost a month. One day when Joseph and his sister were walking back from school, she asked him to pray to Saint Kuriakose Elias Chavara for the cure of his legs and asked him to recite 1 Our Father, 1 Hail Mary and 1 Glory be to the Father. As they walked reciting prayers suddenly Joseph's leg started shivering. Joseph pressed his right leg to the ground and he could now walk properly with his right leg. They continued their prayers and on 30 April 1960, while Joseph and his sister was on the way to elder brother's house, the left leg too became normal. Since then he could walk normally. Joseph believes that it was the intercession Kuriakose Chavara which resulted in the miracle. Rome approved the miracle which led to the beatification of Kuriakose Chavara as Blessed in 1986.

=== Canonization ===
The miracle that was approved for canonization of Kuriakose Chavara to sainthood was the instantaneous, total, and stable cure of the congenital squint (alternating esotropia) in both eyes of Maria Jose Kottarathil, a Catholic girl of age 9 from Pala in Kottayam District of Kerala State in India. Even though Maria was suggested to have surgery by five doctors, Maria and her family decided to pray to Kuriakose Chavara. On 12 October 2007, Maria visited the room and tomb of Kuriakose Chavara at Mannanam with her parents. On 16 October 2007, the squint eyes disappeared. The miracle was approved by the Congregation for the Causes of the Saints on 18 March 2014 which led to the canonization.

== Chronicle of canonization ==
The official canonization process of Kuriakose Chavara started in 1955, Mar Mathew Kavukattu, arch-bishop of Changanacherry, received instructions from Rome to start diocese-level procedure towards the canonisation. On 7 April 1984, Pope John Paul II approved Kuriakose Elias Chavara's practice of heroic virtues and declared him Venerable. Kuriakose Elias Chavara was beatified at Kottayam on 8 February 1986 by Pope John Paul II in the course of a papal visit to India.

On 3 April 2014, Pope Francis authorised the Congregation for the Causes of Saints to promulgate the decrees concerning the miracle attributed to Kuriakose Kathanar's intercession. This confirmed the Pope's approval of Kuriakose Elias Chavara's canonisation. On 23 November 2014, he was canonised at Saint Peter's Square by Pope Francis along with Euphrasia Eluvathingal. Pope Francis stated that "Father Kuriakose Elias was a religious, both active and contemplative, who generously gave his life for the Syro-Malabar Church, putting into action the maxim “sanctification of oneself and the salvation of others."

== Excerpts ==
- "God the almighty granted more time to me than to my predecessors. This was granted to me not so much for me I know, as for the benefit of others." (From the Letter of Chavara to his nephew Joseph Chavara.)
- " A good Christian family is the image of heaven, where persons are living together, by the bond of blood and affection, duly respecting and obeying their parents, and walking peacefully before the Lord and people, ensures their salvation, according to each one’s state of life."
- "Just as without eyes one cannot see the material things of the world, so also without knowledge it will be impossible for us to see or understand the reality of this world and the eternity where God dwells in. As those who have no eyes are called “Blind”, so too those who have no learning are to be called 'intellectually blind'. Hence it is the responsibility of priest to teach the faithful and of parents to teach their children."

== Images ==
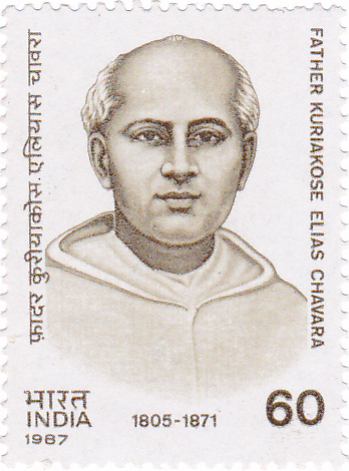
Kuriakose Elias Chavara on a 1987 stamp of India

There are various images of Kuriakose Elias Chavara all over the world. The National Shrine of Saint Jude, Faversham, United Kingdom has a beautiful icon of the Chavara. In 2004 a fire broke out in the Shrine Chapel which destroyed the murals which hung there, and it damaged much of the other artwork. The decision was made to install icons depicting saints inspired by the Carmelite Rule of Saint Albert, and in commemoration of the 8th centenary of the Carmelite Rule in 2007. The icons were written by Sister Petra Clare, a Benedictine hermit living in Scotland, United Kingdom.

== Museums ==
There are many museums associated with life and activities of Kuriakose Elias Chavara. The significant ones are in every world:

St. Chavara Museum, Archives and Research Centre, Mannanam.

The Museum at Mannanam consists of the room he stayed, articles used by him, the documents written by him, the replica of the press he founded, the first school he started and above all it is located in the place where he founded the first monastery.

St. Chavara Kuriakose Elias Museum, koonammavu

This visitors of this museum can enter the room where Chavara died and can also see various articles used by him. This museum is associated with St. Philomena's Church Koonammavu.

Chavara National Museum, Vazhakulam

The exhibits consists of a miniature model of Chavara's birth house, articles used by him and also various antique articles.

Chavara Museum and Art Gallery, Alappuzha

The exhibits in the museum consist of articles used by Chavara such as his cot, the chair used by him in the boat. One of the special exhibit is the box which was used to transfer the remains of Chavara from Koonammavu to Mannanam. It also has old holy Vestments, antique utilities and boxes. A number of books about Chavara are also displayed. Yet another attraction is the miniature model of his birth house.

== See also ==
- East Syriac Rite
- Syriac Christianity
