= Canisius Thekkekara =

Syrian Catholic priest

Servant of God Canisius Thekkekara
- Born: 12 May 1914; Anandapuram, Thrissur district, Kerala
- Died: 29 January 1998 (aged 83); Ampazhakad, Thrissur district, Kerala
- Venerated in: Syro-Malabar Catholic Church

Canisius Thekkekara was a Syrian Catholic (Syro-Malabar Catholic) priest from Carmelites of Mary Immaculate in Kerala in Thrissur. He was declared as Servant of God by Mar Poly Kannookadan, the Bishop of Syro-Malabar Catholic Diocese of Irinjalakuda.
