= Placid J. Podipara =

Indian Syro-Malabar Catholic priest (1899–1985)

Mar Podipara Ouseph Placid Malpan
- Born: Ouseph; 3 October 1899; Mannanam, India
- Died: 27 April 1985 (aged 85); Chethipuzha, India
- Resting place: Chethipuzha, India
- Education: Ph.D. in Theology, Canon Law and Philosophy
- Occupations: Teacher, writer
- Known for: Theology, writings

Mar Podippara Ouseph Placid Malpan, also known as Placidachan (3 October 1899 – 27 April 1985) was an Indian Syriac Catholic priest and scholar of the St. Thomas Christian community. He was a scholar in East Syriac language and liturgy. A book published on the tenth anniversary of his death calls him one of the greatest ecclesiastical luminaries of the 20th century in India. He was a member of the Syro-Malabar Catholic Church and was ordained a priest from the religious institute of the Carmelites of Mary Immaculate (C.M.I.). He was also a theologian, liturgist, orator, professor, ecumenist, and author.

He worked hard to remove the liturgical latinisation of the Syro-Malabar Catholic Church and played a significant part in the establishment of the Syro-Malankara Catholic Church in the Catholic Church. He wrote more than thirty seven books and numerous articles on Saint Thomas Christians in languages including English, Malayalam, German and Latin. He was a Member of the Pontifical commission for codifying Canon Law, Syriac Language examiner of Kerala University, Consultant to the Congregation for the Oriental Churches, Member of Pontifical commission for restoring the Holy Qurbana of Syro Malabar Church, uniting Malankara Church to Catholic Church, Professor of Pontifical Oriental Institute and Pontifical Urbaniana University, Rome, Consultant for preparing the agenda of Second Vatican Council. He had doctorates in Philosophy, Theology and Canon Law which he acquired during his time in Rome.

== Early life ==
Placid was born Joseph (Kochauseppachan) into the Podipara family as the fifth and last child of Chacko and Rosamma in the village, Arpookara, near Kottayam in the Southern Indian state of Kerala. He lost his mother at the age of four and his father at the age of seven. He completed his schooling from St. Ephrem's High School, Mannanam which was run by Syrian Carmelite fathers (later CMI). He entered the novitiate in 1918 and was given a new name, Placid of St. Joseph. Later he was sent to St. Joseph's Seminary, Mangalore run by the Italian Jesuits, for his ecclesiastical studies where he did two years of philosophy and four years of theology. He was ordained priest on 3 December 1927 at Mangalore and celebrated his first Holy Qurbana in St. Joseph's Monastery chapel, Mannanam. As his superiors needed someone qualified to teach in the major seminary, he was sent to Rome for further studies. During his first stint in Rome, which lasted only two years, he acquired doctorates in the fields philosophy, theology and canon law.

== Final years ==
He met with an accident in 1960 which left him with a limp until the end of his life. He returned from Rome in 1980 and continued his studies from Chethipuzha. Towards the last days he was bed-ridden due to partial paralysis which affected his power of speech. He died on 27 April 1985.

== Legacy ==
Father Placid's description of the St. Thomas Christians as "Hindu in Culture, Christian in Religion and Oriental in Worship" continues to be quoted.
