= Syro-Malabar Church =

Eastern Catholic church

Coordinates: 9.9823°N 76.2763°E

- ܥܸܕܬܵܐ ܕܡܲܠܲܒܵܪ ܣܘܼܪܝܵܝܵܐ; സീറോ മലബാർ കത്തോലിക്കാ സഭ
- Seal of the Syro-Malabar Church
- Abbreviation: SMC
- Type: Particular church (sui iuris)
- Classification: Eastern Christian
- Orientation: Eastern Catholic; Syriac
- Scripture: Holy Bible: Peshitta (Syriac); Malayalam POC Bible (Malayalam)
- Theology: East Syriac theology; Catholic theology
- Polity: Episcopal polity
- Governance: Holy Episcopal Synod of the Syro-Malabar Church
- Pope: Leo XIV
- Major Archbishop: Raphael Thattil
- Administration: Major Archiepiscopal Curia
- Parishes: 3,224
- Region: India and Nasrani Malayali diaspora
- Language: Liturgical Syriac; Malayalam; Tamil; Syro-Malabarica; English; Kannada; Hindi and most other Indian languages
- Liturgy: East Syriac Rite – Syro-Malabaric Rite (Note: Liturgy of Mar Addai and Mar Mari, Qudasha of Mar Theodore and Qudasha of Mar Nestorius)
- Headquarters: Mount Saint Thomas, Kakkanad, Kochi, Kerala, India
- Territory: India (with diaspora in Canada, United States, Europe, UK, Australasia and the Middle East)
- Founder: Saint Thomas the Apostle by tradition
- Origin: c. 50 AD (Saint Thomas Christianity, by tradition), 1552 (origin of Eastern Catholicism in the Church of the East), 1887 (modern foundation); Malabar, India
- Separated from: Church of the East
- Branched from: Saint Thomas Christians
- Members: 5.5 million worldwide, as per 2023 Annuario Pontificio; 2.35 million in Kerala, per 2011 Kerala state census
- Clergy: Bishops: 65; Priests: 9,121
- Publications: syromalabarvision.com
- Official website: syromalabarchurch.in
- Official News Portal: syromalabarnews.com

The Syro-Malabar Church, also known as the Syro-Malabar Catholic Church or Edtha Qatholiqi d'Malabar Suryaya, (Note: Syriac: ܥܸܕܬܵܐ ܩܵܬܘܿܠܝܼܩܝܼ ܕܡܲܠܲܒܵܪ ܣܘܼܪܝܵܝܵܐ or ܥܸܕܬܵܐ ܕܡܲܠܲܒܵܪ ܣܘܼܪܝܵܝܵܐ; Malayalam: സുറിയാനി മലബാർ സഭ (സുറിയാനി കത്തോലിക്കാ സഭ)) is an Eastern Catholic church based in Kerala, India. It is a sui iuris (autonomous) particular church in full communion with the Holy See and the worldwide Catholic Church, with self-governance under the Code of Canons of the Eastern Churches (CCEO). The major archbishop presides over the entire church. The incumbent Major Archbishop is Raphael Thattil, serving since January 2024. It is the largest Syriac Christian church and the largest Eastern Catholic church. Syro-Malabar is a prefix reflecting the church's use of the East Syriac liturgy and origins in Malabar (modern Kerala and parts of Tamil Nadu). The name has been in usage in official Vatican documents since the nineteenth century.

The Syro-Malabar Church is primarily based in India: along with five metropolitan archeparchies and ten suffragan eparchies in Kerala, there are 4 Archeparchies and 13 eparchies in other parts of India, and also four eparchies outside India. The Syro-Malabar Synod of Bishops, canonically convoked and presided over by the major archbishop, constitutes the supreme authority of the church. The Major Archiepiscopal Curia of the church is based in Kakkanad, Kochi. It is the largest among Saint Thomas Christians communities, with a population of 2.35 million in Kerala as per the 2011 Kerala state census and 4.53 million worldwide as estimated in the 2023 Annuario Pontificio. It is the second largest sui iuris church within the communion of the Catholic Church, second in scale only to the Latin Church.

The Syro-Malabar Church traditionally links its origins to Thomas the Apostle's evangelization efforts in 1st-century AD India. The earliest recorded organised Christian presence in India dates to the 6th century, when Persian missionaries of the East Syriac Rite tradition of the Church of the East, established themselves in modern-day Kerala and Sri Lanka. The Church of the East shared communion with the Roman Imperial Church, within Nicene Christianity, until the Council of Ephesus in the 5th century, separating primarily over differences in Christology and for political reasons. The Syro-Malabar Church uses a variant of the East Syriac Rite, which dates back to 3rd century Edessa, Upper Mesopotamia. Hence, it is a part of Syriac Christianity by liturgy and heritage.

After the schism of 1552, a portion of the Church of the East entered communion with the Holy See of Rome, forming what became the modern-day Chaldean Catholic Church. Throughout the later half of the 16th century, the Malabar Church was under Chaldean Catholic jurisdiction as the Archdiocese of Angamaly. Through the Synod of Diamper of 1599, the Chaldean jurisdiction was abolished and the Malabar Church was reorganized as the Archdiocese of Cranganore and made subject to the Padroado Latin Catholic Primatal Archbishopric of Goa. In 1653, after a half-century of administration under the Padroado missionaries, the local Christians revolted and took the Coonan Cross Oath. In response, Pope Alexander VII, with the help of Carmelite missionaries, was by 1662 able to reconcile the majority of dissidents with the Latin Catholic Church under Bishop Parambil Chandy, the native Apostolic vicar of Malabar. During the 17th and 18th centuries, the Archdiocese of Cranganore remained under the Syro-Malabar, but it was later suppressed and integrated into the modern day Latin Archdiocese of Verapoly.

After more than two centuries under the hegemony of the Latin Church, in 1887 Pope Leo XIII fully emancipated the Syro-Malabars, though the Archdiocese of Verapoly remained as the jurisdiction for Latin Catholics. He established two Apostolic Vicariates for Syro-Malabar, Thrissur and Changanassery (originally named Kottayam), and in 1896, the Vicariate of Ernakulam was erected as well, governed by indigenous Syro-Malabar bishops. In 1923, the Syro-Malabar hierarchy was organized and unified under Ernakulam as the Metropolitan See, with Augustine Kandathil as the first head and archbishop. Consequently, the Syro-Malabar Church became an autonomous sui iuris Eastern Catholic Church.

The Syro-Malabars are unique among Catholics in their inculturation with traditional Indian customs through Saint Thomas Christian heritage. The Saint Thomas Christian community has been described as "Indian in culture, Christian in faith and Syriac in liturgy". The church is predominantly of the Malayali ethnic group who speak Malayalam, although there are a minority of Tamils, Telugus, and North Indians from the various eparchies outside Kerala. Following emigration of the church's members, eparchies have been established in other parts of India and in other countries to serve especially the diaspora living in the Western world. There are four eparchies outside of India, located in English-speaking countries: Australia, Canada, the United Kingdom, and United States. Marth Alphonsa is the church's first canonized saint, followed by Mar Kuriakose Chavara, Marth Euphrasia, and Marth Mariam Thresia. The Syro-Malabar Church is one of the two Eastern Catholic Churches in India, the other being the Syro-Malankara Church, which represents the faction of the Puthenkoor that entered into full communion with the Holy See in 1930.

== History ==
=== Pre-Coonan Cross Oath ===
It is believed that the Saint Thomas Christians in Malabar came into contact with the Persian Church of the East in the middle of the 4th century. Saint Thomas Christians looked to Catholicos-Patriarch of the Church of the East for ecclesiastical authority. Although the bishops from the Middle East were the spiritual rulers of the church, the general administration of the Church of Kerala was governed by the indigenous Archdeacon. The Archdeacon was the head of Saint Thomas Christians. Even when there were more than one foreign bishop, there was only one Archdeacon for the entire community.

The Church of the East Patriarch Shemon VII Ishoyahb's unpopularity led to the schism of 1552, due to the patriarchal succession being hereditary, normally from uncle to nephew. Opponents appointed the monk Shimun VIII Yohannan Sulaqa as a rival patriarch. Sulaqa's subsequent consecration by Pope Julius III (1550–1555) saw a permanent split in the Church of the East; and the reunion with Catholic Church resulted in the formation of the modern-day Chaldean Catholic Church of Iraq.

Thus, parallel to the "traditionalist" (often referred as Nestorian) Patriarchate of the East, the "Chaldean" Patriarchate in communion with Rome came into existence. Following the schism, both traditionalist and Chaldean factions began sending their bishops to Malabar. Abraham of Angamaly was one among them. He first came to India in 1556 from the traditionalist patriarchate. Deposed from his position in 1558, he was taken to Lisbon by the Portuguese, escaped at Mozambique and left for his mother church in Mesopotamia, entered into communion with the Chaldean patriarchate and Rome in 1565, received his episcopal ordination again from the Latin patriarch of Venice as arranged by the Pope Pius IV (1559–1565) in Rome. Subsequently, Abraham was appointed by Pope as Archbishop of Angamaly, with letters to the Archbishop of Goa and the Bishop of Cochin.

In 1597, Abraham of Angamaly died. The Catholic Portuguese padroado Archbishop of Goa, Aleixo de Menezes, downgraded the Angamaly Archdiocese into a suffragan diocese of the Archdiocese of Goa and appointed the Jesuit Francisco Ros as Bishop of Angamaly. Menezes held the Synod of Diamper in 1599 to bring the Saint Thomas Christians under the complete authority of the Latin Church.

=== Coonan Cross Oath ===
The oppressive rule of the Portuguese padroado eventually led to a revolt in 1653, known as the Coonan Cross Oath. The Thomas Christians including their native priests assembled in the church of Our Lady at Mattancherry near Cochin, formally stood before a crucifix and lighted candles and solemnly swore an oath upon the Gospel that they never again accept another European prelate. The exact wording used in Coonan Cross Oath is disputed. There are various versions about the wording of oath, one version being that the oath was directed against the Portuguese, another that it was directed against Jesuits, yet another version that it was directed against the authority of Latin Catholics.

=== Post-Coonan Cross Oath ===
After the Coonan Cross Oath, the leaders of Saint Thomas Christians assembled at Edappally, where four senior priests Anjilimoottil Itty Thommen Kathanar of Kallisseri, Palliveettil Chandy Kathanar of Kuravilangad, Kadavil Chandy Kathanar of Kaduthuruthy and Vengoor Geevarghese Kathanar of Angamaly were appointed as advisors of the Archdeacon. On 22 May 1653, at a general meeting held in Alangad, twelve priests laid hands on Archdeacon Thoma, proclaiming him bishop. After the consecration of Thoma I, The information about this consecration was then communicated to all the churches. The vast majority of churches accepted Thoma I as their bishop.

At this point of time, Portuguese authorities requested direct intervention of Rome and hence Pope sent Carmelite Missionaries in two groups from the Propagation of the Faith to Malabar headed by Fr. Sebastiani and Fr. Hyacinth. Fr. Sebastiani arrived first in 1655 and began to speak directly with the Thoma I. Fr. Sebastiani, with the help of Portuguese, gained the support of many, especially with the support of Palliveettil Chandy, Kadavil Chandy Kathanar and Vengoor Geevarghese Kathanar. These were the three of the four counselors of Thoma I, who had defected with Francisco Garcia Mendes, Archbishop of Cranganore, before the arrival of Sebastaini, according to Jesuit reports.

The Carmelite missionaries succeeded in convincing a group of St.Thomas Christians that the consecration of Archdeacon as bishop was not legitimate and Thoma I started losing his followers. In the meantime, Sebastiani returned to Rome and was ordained as bishop by Pope on 15 December 1659. Between 1661 and 1662, out of the 116 churches, the Carmelites claimed 84 churches, leaving the native archdeacon Thoma I with 32 churches. The 84 churches and their congregations were the body from which the Syro-Malabar Catholic Church has descended.

The other 32 churches and their congregations represented the nucleus from which the Jacobite Syrian Christian Church (Malankara Syriac Orthodox Church), the Malankara Orthodox Syrian Church, the Malabar Independent Syrian Church, the Marthoma Syrian Church, and the Syro-Malankara Catholic Church have originated. In 1663, with the conquest of Cochin by the Dutch, the control of the Portuguese on the Malabar coast was lost. The Dutch declared that all the Portuguese missionaries had to leave Kerala. Before leaving Kerala, on 1 February 1663 Sebastiani consecrated Palliveettil Chandy as the Metran of the Catholic St. Thomas Christians.

Thoma I, meanwhile, sent requests to various Oriental churches to receive canonical consecration as bishop. In 1665 Gregorios Abdal Jaleel, a bishop sent by the Syriac Orthodox Patriarch of Antioch, arrived in India. The independent group under the leadership of Thoma I which resisted the authority of the Portuguese padroado welcomed him. Abdal Jaleel consecrated Thoma I canonically as a bishop and regularised his episcopal succession. This led to the first lasting formal schism in the Saint Thomas Christian community.

Thereafter, the faction affiliated with the Catholic Church under Bishop Palliveettil Chandy came to be known as Pazhayakuttukar (or "Old Allegiance"), and the branch affiliated with Thoma I came to be known as Puthenkūttukār (or "New Allegiance"). They were also known as Jacobite Syrians and they organized themselves as independent Malankara Church. The visits of prelates from the Syriac Orthodox Church of Antioch continued since then and this led to gradual replacement of the East Syriac Rite liturgy with the West Syriac Rite and the Puthenkūttukār affiliated to the Miaphysite Christology of the Oriental Orthodox Communion.

The Pazhayakuttukar faction remained in communion with the Catholic and preserved the traditional East Syriac (Persian) liturgy and Dyophysite Christology. They were also known as Romo-Syrians or Syrian Catholics. They also used the title Malankara Church initially. (Note: "In the travelogue Varthamanappusthakam (dated to 1790) written by Paremmakkal Thoma Kathanar, the author uses the terms Malankara Pallikkar, Malankara Idavaka, Malankara Sabha etc. to refer to the Syrian Catholic community.) Following the death of Palliveettil Chandy in 1687, the Syrian Catholics of the Malabar coast came under the parallel double jurisdiction of Vicariate Apostolic of Malabar under Roman Catholic Carmelites and Archdiocese of Cranganore under the Padroado. Thus many priests and laymen attempted to persuade the Pope to restore their Chaldean Catholic rite and hierarchy of the local church, and for the appointment of bishops from local priests. To represent their position, Kerala's Syrian Catholics Joseph Kariattil and Paremmakkal Thomma Kathanar went to Rome in 1778. While they were in Europe, Kariatty Joseph Kathanar was installed in Portugal as the Archbishop of Kodungalloor Archdiocese.

While journeying home, they stayed in Goa where Kariattil died before he could formally take charge. Before he died, Kariattil appointed Kathanar as the Administrator of Kodungalloor Archdiocese after him. The new administrator ran the affairs of the church, establishing his headquarters at Angamaly. In 1790, the headquarters of the Archdiocese was shifted to Vadayar, dodging the invasion of Tippu Sultan. In the last four years of his life, Thomma Kathanar managed church administration from his own parish, Ramapuram.

Angamaly Padiyola, a declaration of the Pazhayakūr gave the history of Saint Thomas Christians up to 1787 and advocated for the appointment of a native bishop that adhered to the local traditions.

Latin Catholic Carmelite clergy from Europe served as bishops, and the church along with the Latin Catholics was under the Apostolic Vicariate of Malabar (modern-day Roman Catholic Archdiocese of Verapoly). In 1887, the Holy See established two Apostolic Vicariates, Thrissur and Kottayam (later Changanassery) under the guidance of indigenous Syro-Malabar bishops, and named the church as "The Syro-Malabar Church" to distinguish them from the Latins. The Holy See re-organized the Apostolic Vicariates in 1896 into three Apostolic Vicariates (Thrissur, Ernakulam, and Changanassery). A fourth Apostolic Vicariate (Kottayam) was established in 1911 for Knanaya Catholics.

=== Restoration of the Syro-Malabar hierarchy ===
In 1923, Pope Pius XI set up a fully-fledged Syro-Malabar hierarchy with Ernakulam-Angamaly as the Metropolitan See and Augustine Kandathil as the first head and archbishop of the church. In 1992, Pope John Paul II raised the Syro-Malabar Church to major archepiscopal rank and appointed Cardinal Antony Padiyara of Ernakulam as the first major archbishop.

The Syro-Malabar Church shares the same liturgy with the Chaldean Catholic Church based in Iraq and the independent Assyrian Church of the East based in Iraq, including its archdiocese the Chaldean Syrian Church of India. The Syro-Malabar Church is the second-largest particular church (sui iuris) in the Catholic Church, after the Latin Church.

The Catholic Saint Thomas Christians (Pazhayakūttukār) came to be known as the Syro Malabar Catholics from 1932 onwards to differentiate them from the Syro-Malankara Catholics in Kerala. The Indian East Syriac Catholic hierarchy was restored on 21 December 1923 with Augustine Kandathil as the first metropolitan and head of the church with the name Syro-Malabar.

=== 2020s ===
In 2021, the Syro Malabar Synod of Bishops announced that the celebration of the Qurbana according to the Second Vatican Council reform: the liturgy of the word would be celebrated coram populo, while the rest of the Qurbana would be celebrated facing the altar. After hearing this announcement, many priests of the Syro-Malabar Catholic Major Archeparchy of Ernakulam–Angamaly announced that they would continue their public facing Qurbana. Pope Francis appointed Cyril Vasiľ as the Pontifical Delegate and Andrews Thazhath as Apostolic Administrator for the Archdiocese in matters of solving the crisis but was unsuccessful. On 7 December 2023, Pope Francis wrote in a letter to George Alencherry accepting his resignation as Major Archbishop of Ernakulam–Angamaly. He also accepted the resignation of Andrews Thazhath as the Apostolic Administrator and appointed Bosco Puthur, due to Thazhath being the Archbishop of Trichur and President of the Catholic Bishops Conference of India. Pope Francis then made a video message to the people of Ernakulam-Angamaly asking them to only do the Uniform Mass starting Christmas and saying there will be punishment for those who do not. When Christmas came, only 290 churches of 328 churches held the Uniform Mass. The Vatican is now currently discussing further action.

On 9 January 2024, Raphael Thattil was elected as major archbishop by the Syro-Malabar Synod of Bishops. Pope Francis confirmed the election, with Thattil now heading the Syro-Malabar Catholic Church.

== Liturgy ==
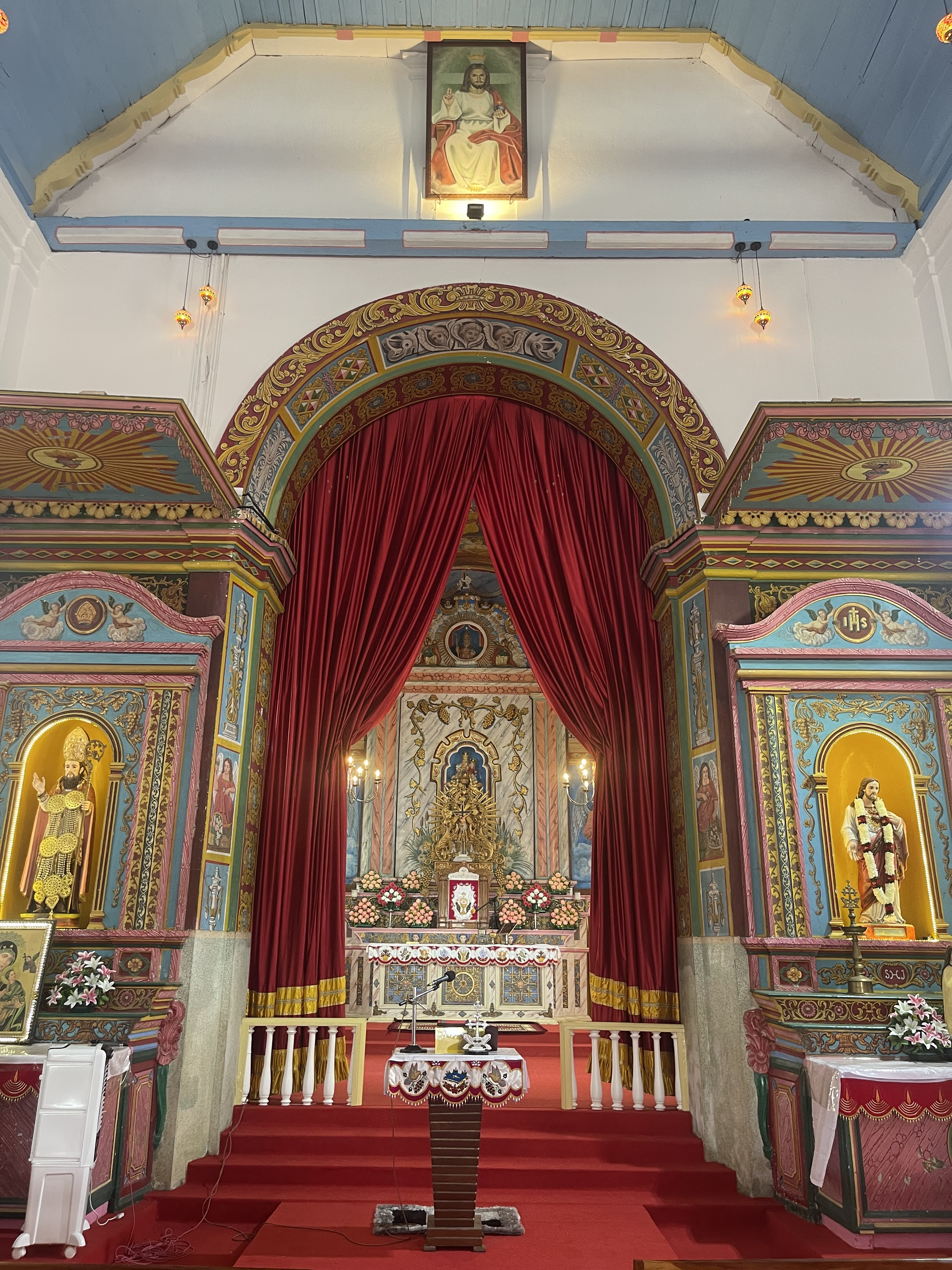
Altar of a Syro-Malabar Catholic church

The East Syriac Eucharistic Liturgy, which is called Holy Qurbana in East Syriac Aramaic and means "Eucharist", is celebrated in its solemn form on Sundays and special occasions. During the celebration of the Qurbana, priests and deacons put on elaborate vestments which are unique to the Syro-Malabar Catholic Church. The most solemn form of Holy Mass (Holy Qurbana) is Rāsa, literally which means "Mystery".

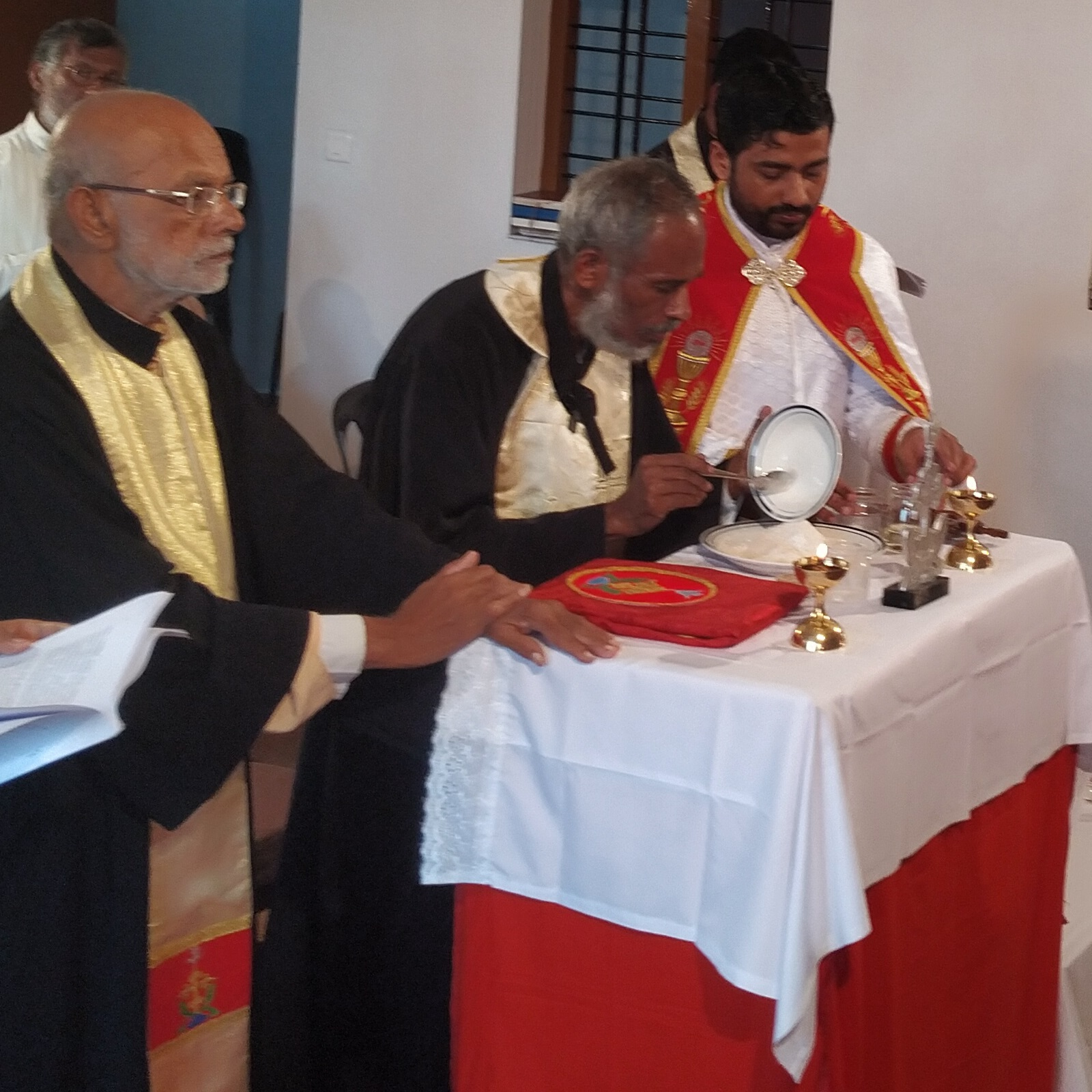
Rite of Renewal of Holy Leaven (Malka)

=== Forced liturgical latinization ===
The liturgy of the Syro-Malabar Church was in a heavily latinized state when the church was finally emancipated in 1896 after 300 years of Latin administration established by the Portuguese in the 16th century. The history of latinization in the Syro-Malabar Church stems from the colonial Synod of Diamper in 1599, which among other things, declared the Chaldean Catholic Patriarch a Nestorian heretic. The successive Jesuit and Carmelite administration indulged in further latinizations in the Syro-Malabar Church.

Liturgical latinisation was furthered in 1896 by Ladislaus Zaleski, the Apostolic Delegate to India, who requested permission to translate the Roman Pontifical into Syriac. This was the choice of some Malabar prelates, who chose it over the East Syriac Rite and West Syriac Rite pontificals. A large number of Syro-Malabarians had schismed and joined with Assyrians at that time and various delayed the approval of this translation, until in 1934 Pope Pius XI stated that latinization was to no longer be encouraged. He initiated a process of liturgical reform that sought to restore the oriental nature of the Latinized Syro-Malabar rite.

=== Restoration of East Syriac liturgy ===
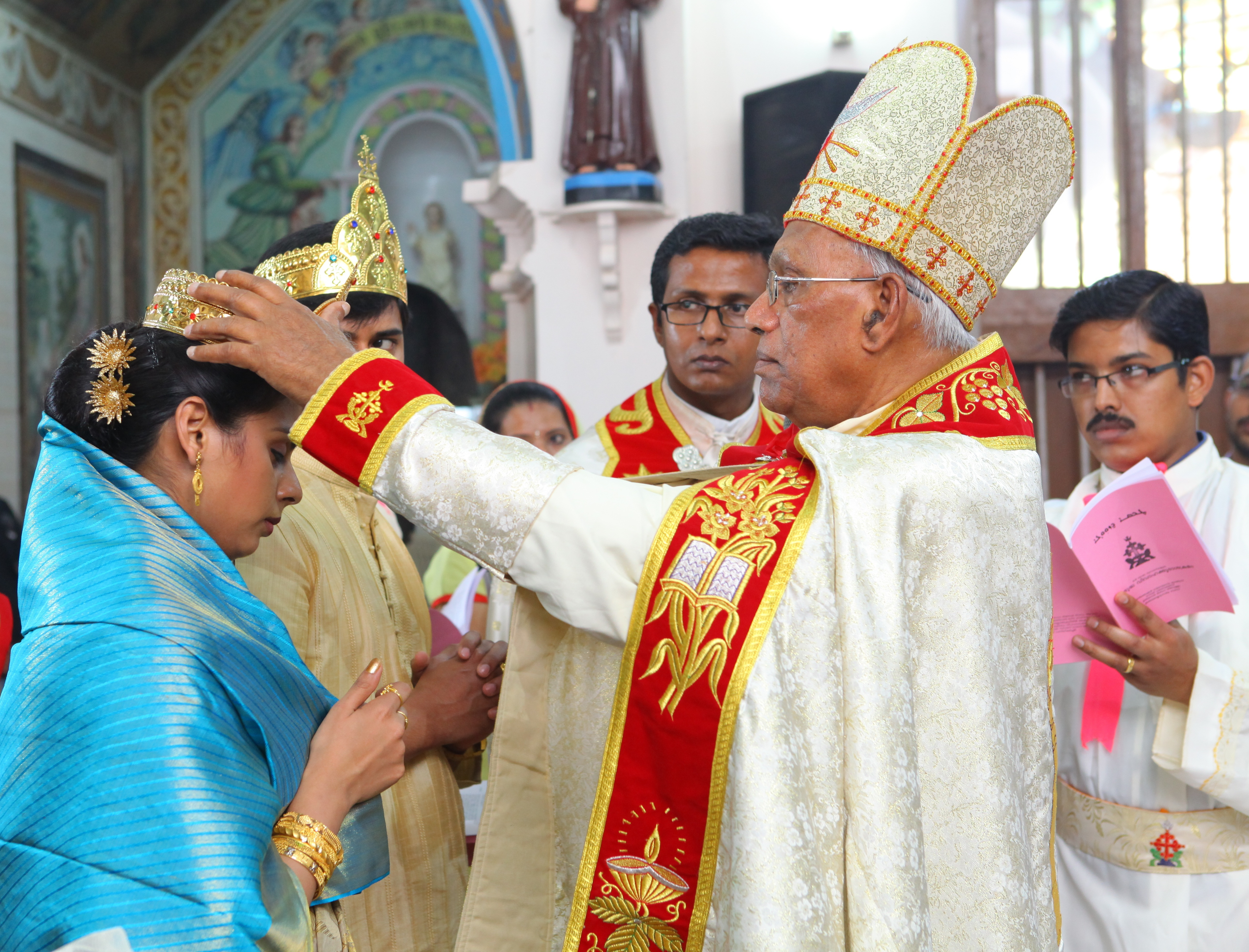
The Mystery of Crowning during a Syro-Malabar wedding

East Syriac liturgy has three anaphorae: those of the Holy Apostles (Saints Mar Addai and Mar Mari), Mar Theodore Mpašqana, and Mar Nestorius. The first is the most popularly and extensively used. The second is used (except when the third is ordered) from Advent to Palm Sunday. The third was traditionally used on the Epiphany and the feasts of St. John the Baptist and of the Greek Doctors, both of which occur in Epiphany-tide on the Wednesday of the Rogation of the Ninevites, and on Maundy Thursday. The same pro-anaphoral part (Liturgy of the Word) serves for all three.

In the second half of the 20th century, there was a movement for better understanding of the liturgical rites. A restored Eucharistic liturgy, drawing on the original East Syriac sources, was approved by Pope Pius XII in 1957, and for the first time on the feast of St. Thomas on 3 July 1962 the vernacular, Malayalam, was introduced for the celebration of the Syro-Malabar Qurbana.

In 2021, the Syro-Malabar Catholic Church adopted a uniformed manner of celebration liturgies, removing the practice of facing versus populum during the Liturgy of Eucharist. Following this, there has been sustained dissent by some clergy and laity in the Archeparchy of Ernakulam-Angamaly.

=== Liturgy dispute ===
The question of liturgical identity was the main obstacle the newly formed hierarchy had to solve and there was difference of opinion among the bishops about the direction of liturgical reform. The Pazhayakoottukar were using a heavily latinised form of the East Syriac liturgy which they had inherited from the period that immediately followed the Synod of Diamper. The Carmelite missionaries imposed further latinization in this rite. The opinion of the bishops were divided with some aspiring for a return to genuine East Syriac Rite while others opting for retaining the latinized rite or a new process of inculturation copying the North Indian Brahminical rites. In 1934, Rome decided for the re-establishment of the genuine East Syriac rite, and in 1962 the Chaldean Pontifical was reintroduced. But many Latin rite priests and bishops of the Syro-Malabar Church opposed these decisions and identified those who supported the reintroduced liturgy as 'Chaldean traditionalists' (Kaldāyavādikal). The reforms of the 2nd Council of Vatican encouraged the recovery of lost Eastern Catholic liturgical traditions and in 1986 Pope John Paul II inaugurated the reintroduced liturgy personally in Kottayam, during his visit to India, in an attempt to resolve the confusion in liturgy. However following the introduction of versus populum liturgy in the Latin Rite, those who oppose the reintroduced liturgy began practicing it among themselves. Post-Vatican II liturgical innovations based on Hindu Brahminical inculturation, such as the Bāratīyapūja (the 'Indian Mass') supported by Archbishop Parecattil and many of the Indian Latin prelates emerged during this period. This accelerated the liturgical conflict within the Syro-Malabar hierarchy. In response, the unauthorised liturgical forms were strictly forbidden by Rome. However the differences in the direction of the priest during the liturgy, namely ad orientem and versus populum, continued. Following the elevation of the Syro-Malabar Church to major archiepiscopal rank in 1992, the church initiated discussions on the resolution of differences and in 1999, they decided on a uniform mode of liturgical practice combining both styles. However this was met with widespread protests among the clergy and many bishops temporarily paused its implementation. In 2020, the church leadership resumed this process and implemented it in all eparchies except the Archeparchy of Ernakulam-Angamaly, where it continue to face fierce protests by the local clergy which demands complete versus populum liturgy.

== Hierarchy ==
=== List of ecclesiastical heads ===
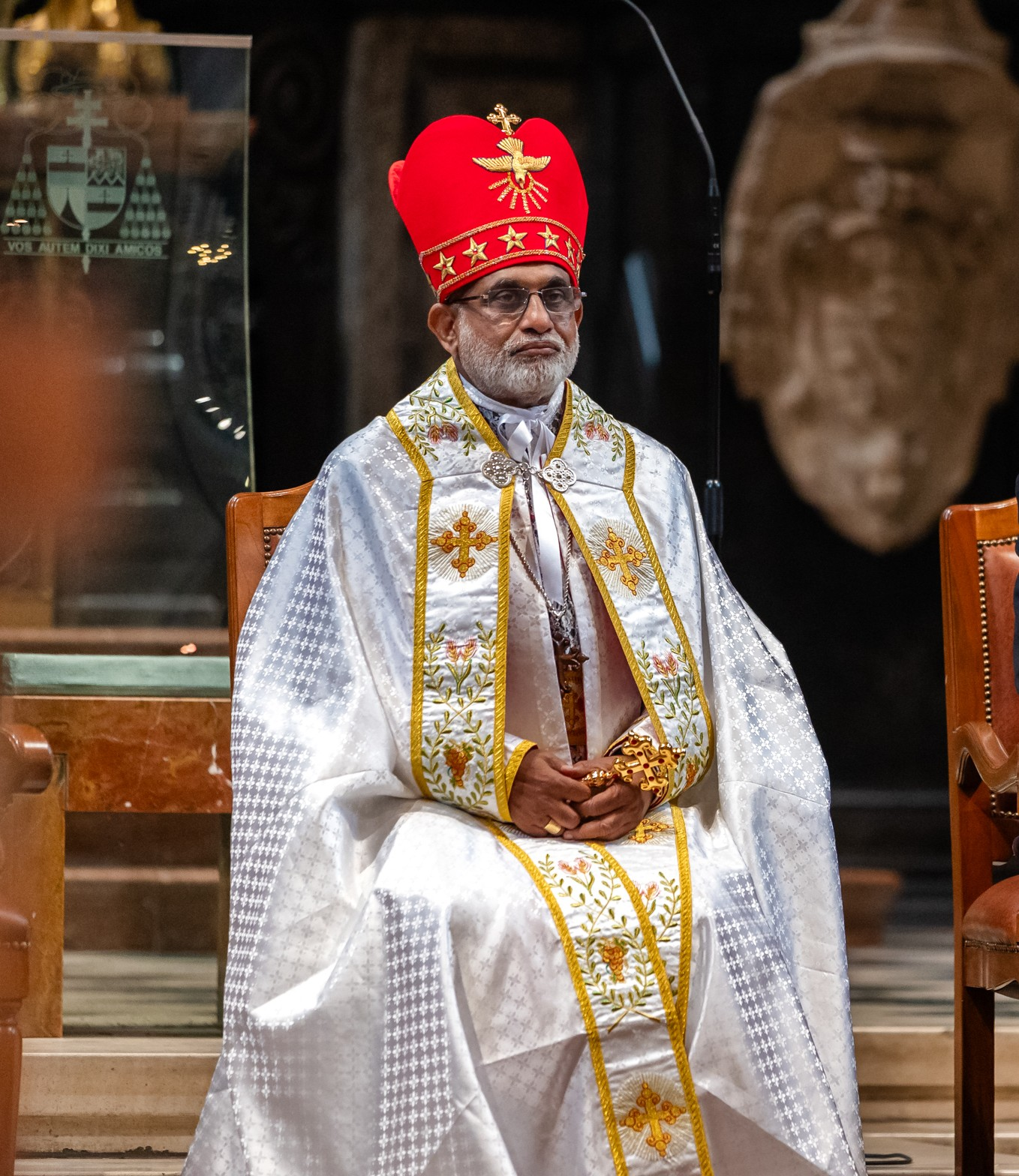
Mar Raphael Thattil, Major Archbishop of the Syro-Malabar Catholic Church since 2024, clad in liturgical vestments

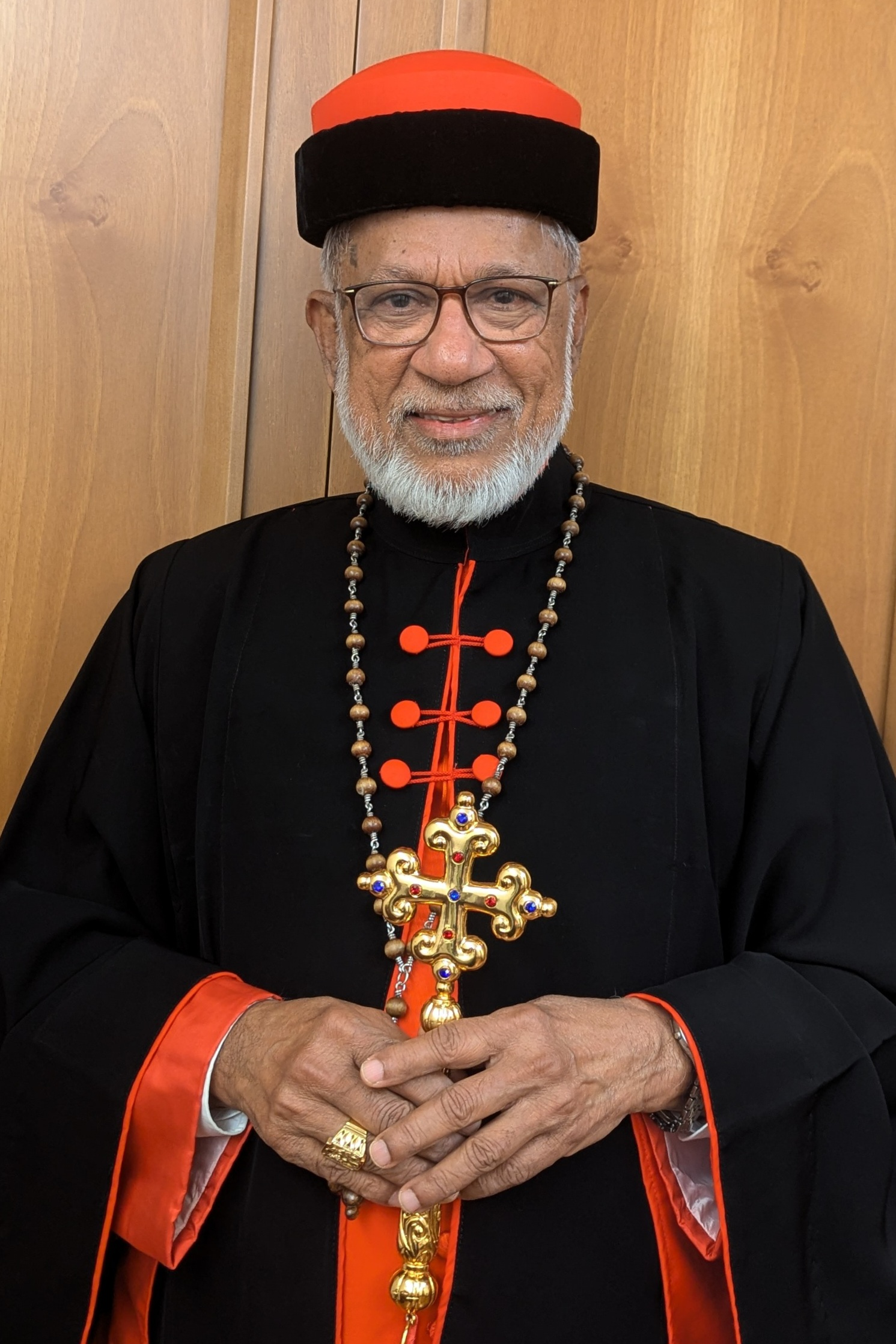
Mar George Cardinal Alencherry, Major Archbishop Emeritus, in traditional non-liturgical vestments

==== Chaldean Catholic metropolitans of India ====
- Joseph Sulaqa (1558)
- Abraham of Angamaly (1565)

==== Native bishops after Coonan Cross Oath ====
- Palliveettil Chandy (1663, Vicar apostolic of Malabar)
- Kariattil Iousep (1783, Archbishop of Cranganore)

==== Heads of the restored Syro-Malabar hierarchy ====
- Augustine Kandathil (1923, Metropolitan Archbishop of Ernakulam)

==== Major archbishops ====
- Mar Antony Padiyara (1992–1996)
  - Mar Abraham Kattumana(1992-1995) (Note: Pontifical Delegate - exercised the authority of administration of the church by the papal bull, though the title of Major-archbishop was held by Mar Antony Padiyara)
- Mar Varkey Vithayathil (1997–2011)
- Mar George Alencherry (2011–2023)
- Mar Raphael Thattil (since 2024)

=== Syro-Malabar major archiepiscopal curia ===
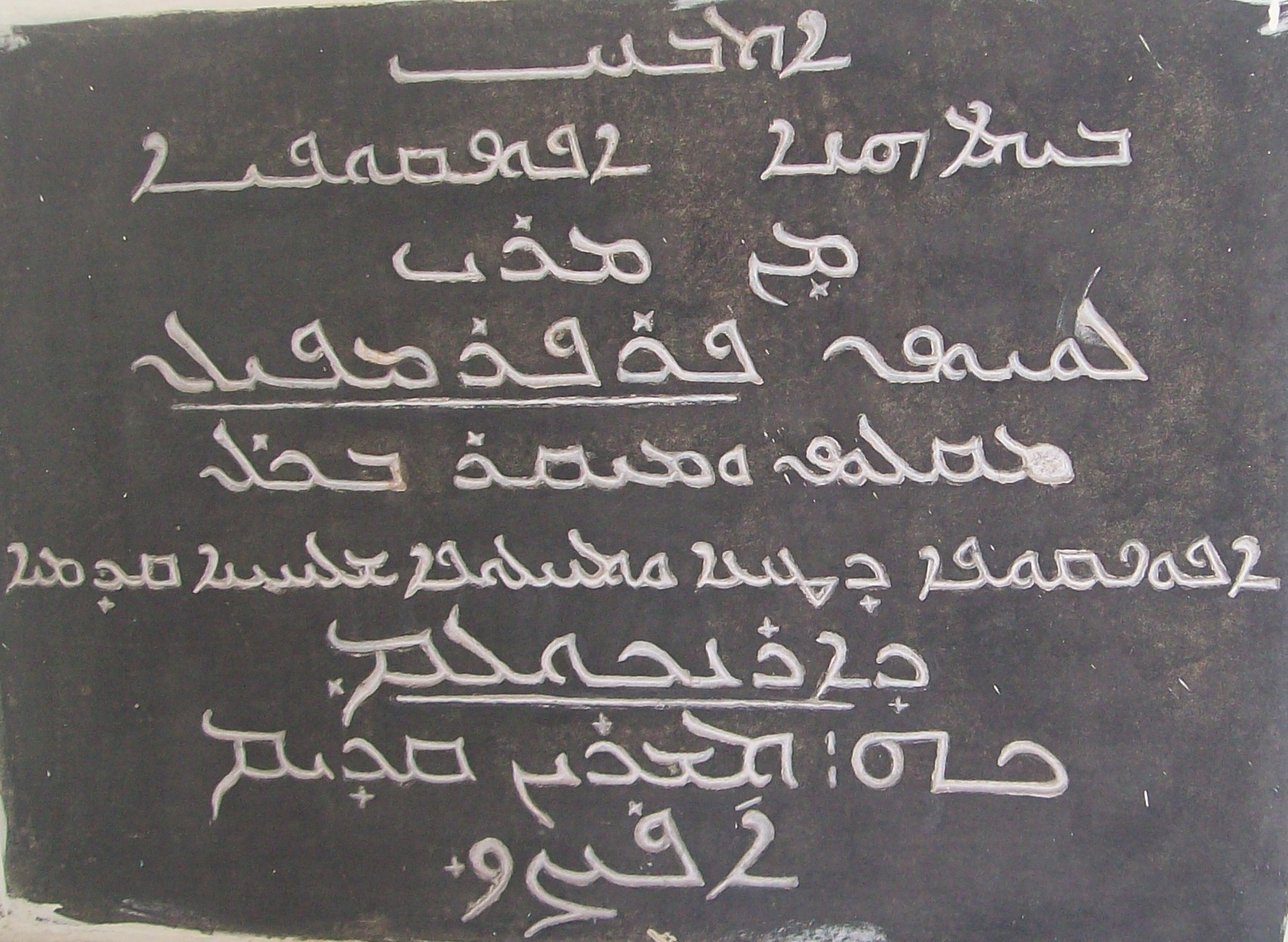
Syriac inscription at Syro-Malabar Catholic Major Archbishop's House, Ernakulam

The curia of the Syro-Malabar Church began to function in March 1993 at the archbishop's house of Ernakulam-Angamaly. In May 1995, it was shifted to new premises at Mount St. Thomas near Kakkanad, Kochi. The newly constructed curial building was opened in July 1998.

The administration of the Syro-Malabar Church has executive and judicial roles. The major archbishop, officials, various commissions, committees, and the permanent synod form the executive part. The permanent synod and other offices are formed in accordance with the Code of Canons of the Eastern Churches (CCEO). The officials include the chancellor, vice-chancellor, and other officers. Various commissions are appointed by the major archbishop: Liturgy, Pastoral Care of the Migrant and Evangelisation, Particular Law, Catechism, Ecumenism, Catholic Doctrine, Clergy and Institutes of Consecrated Life, and Societies of Apostolic Life.

The members of the commissions are ordinarily bishops, but include priests. For judicial activities there is the major archiepiscopal ordinary tribunal formed in accordance with CCEO which has a statutes and sufficient personnel, with a president as its head. At present, Rev. Dr. Jose Chiramel is the president. The Major archiepiscopal curia functions in the curial building in Kerala, India. They have prepared the particular law for their Church and promulgated it part by part in Synodal News, the official Bulletin of this Church. There are statutes for the permanent synod and for the superior and ordinary tribunals. CCEO c. 122 § 2 is specific in the particular law, that the term of the office shall be five years and the same person shall not be appointed for more than two terms consecutively.

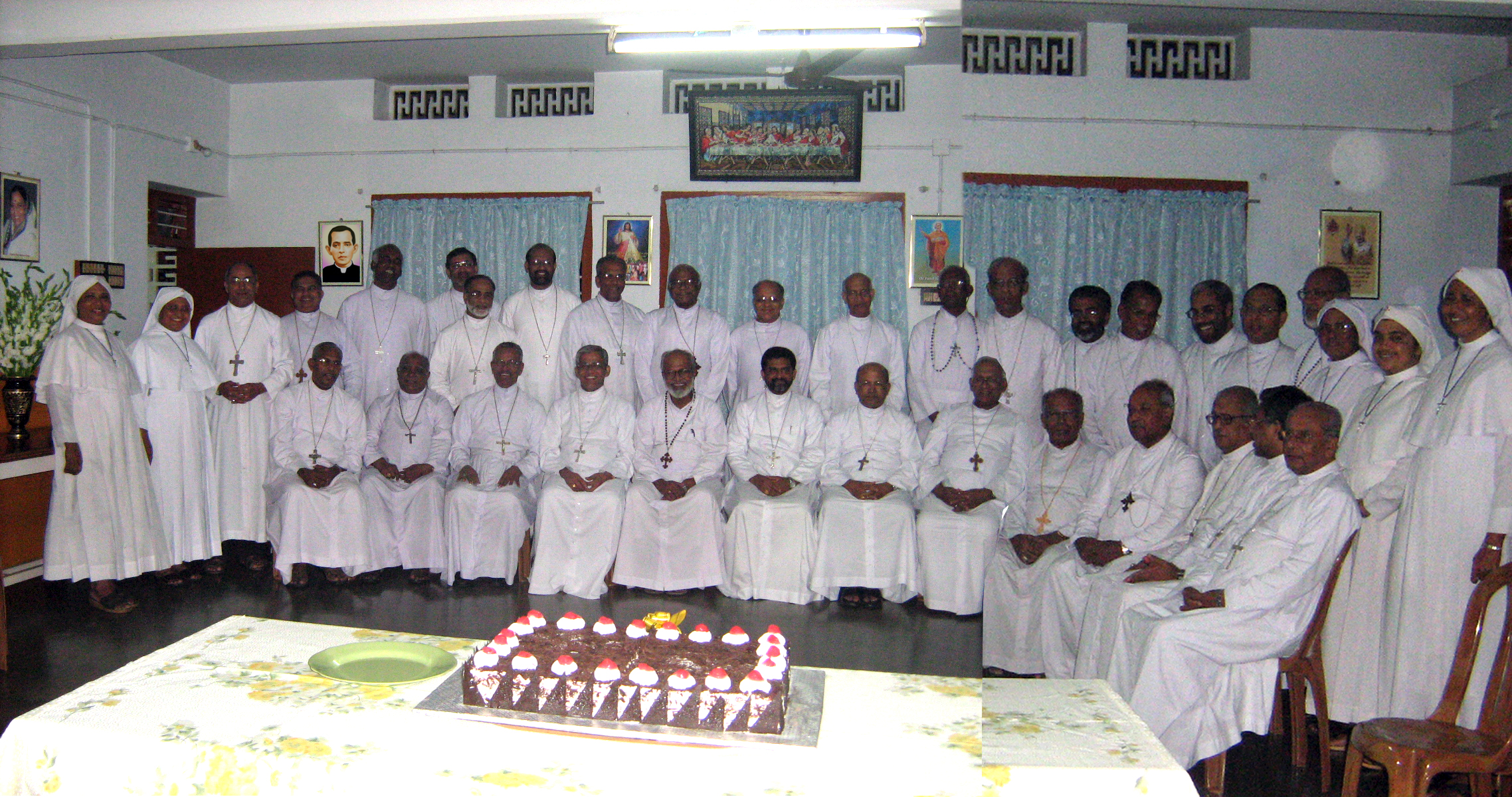
Syro-Malabar bishops at the Generalate of Sisters of the Destitute

== Jurisdictions ==
There are 35 eparchies (dioceses). Nine of them are Metropolitan archeparchies, each administered by a Metropolitan Archbishop leading the ecclesiastical provinces of the church comprising 22 suffragan eparchies, all in India. The Archeparchy of Kottayam enjoys personal jurisdiction over the Southist (Knanaya) Syro-Malabar Catholics in India. The remaining 4 eparchies serve the United States, Oceania, the UK and Canada. In addition, there are apostolic visitors appointed for EU and GCC countries.

== Religious Institutes for Consecrated Life ==
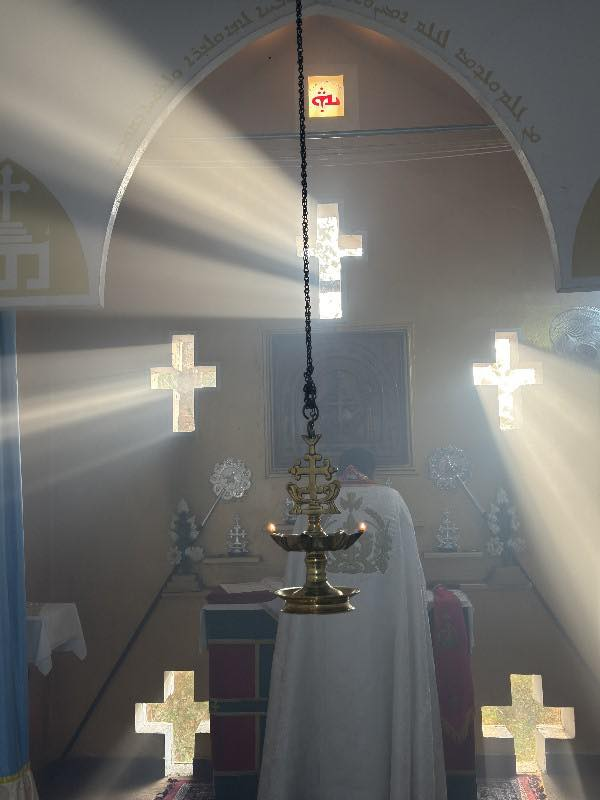
A Syro Malabar monastery in Kuravilangad

The church has been instrumental in the formation of several indigenous institutes, first of their kind in India, for example, the Carmelites of Mary Immaculate, which is the first indigenous institute for men in the country. Most of these institutions are focused upon mission work especially in the northern non Christian dominant regions of India, with congregations like the CST and MST, being incharge of entire eparchies.

Religious Institutes for consecrated life are divided in the Eastern Catholic Church Law (Code of Canons of the Oriental Churches; CCEO) as Monasteries, Hermitages, Orders, Congregations, Societies of Common Life in the Manner of Religious, Secular Institutes, and Societies of Apostolic Life, depending upon their nature of charism and apostolate. Furthermore, they vary in their jurisdictional authority, with three levels of rights: pontifical, major-archiepiscopal, and eparchial. These mainly denote who they answer to concerning establishment, expansion, and governance.

== Major archiepiscopal churches ==
The following is the list of the Major archiepiscopal pilgrimage churches in the order of their elevation to this title by the Holy Synod of the church.

| Name of the church | Location | Jurisdiction | Year |
|---|---|---|---|
| Marth Mariam Archdeacon Church | Kuravilangad | Palai | 2018 |
| Marth Mariam Knanaya Church | Kaduthuruthy | Kottayam | 2020 |
| St. Sebastian's Church | Thazhekad | Irinjalakuda | 2020 |
| Mar Sleeva Church | Nadavayal | Mananthavady | 2020 |
| Mar Thoma Church | Palayoor | Thrissur | 2020 |
| Marth Mariam Church | Kudamaloor | Changanassery | 2020 |
| Marth Mariam Church (Akkarappally) | Kanjirapally | Kanjirappally | 2020 |
| Marth Mariam Church | Arakuzha | Kothamangalam | 2021 |
| St. Joseph's Church | Peravoor | Tellicherry | 2022 |
| St. Sebastian's Church | Nedumkandam | Idukki | 2024 |

== Seminaries ==
=== Major seminaries ===
Seminaries of the Syro-Malabar Church are under the general supervision of the Roman Congregation for the Eastern Churches and share the Major archbishop as their common Chancellor. Saint Joseph's Seminary in Mangalapuzha, established by Syrian Catholics in 1865, is the oldest of the extant seminaries of the church. However, the Saint Thomas Seminary in Vadavathoor is the first seminary to be established under the Syro-Malabar hierarchy.

== List of prominent Syro-Malabar Catholics ==
=== Prominent Syro-Malabar leaders ===
- Kadavil Chandy, Syriacist, poet, and church leader.
- Parampil Chandy, the first Indian native Catholic bishop
- Joseph Kariattil, the first Indian native Catholic Metropolitan archbishop
- Paremmakkal Thoma Kathanar, administrator of the Archdiocese of Cranganore-Angamaly and author of Varthamanappusthakam, the first travelogue in an Indian language
- Thachil Matthoo Tharakan, lay leader and Minister of Travancore
- Nidhiry Mani Kathanar, church leader and founder of Deepika, the first Malayalam daily
- Palackal Thoma, scholar and founder of C.M.I.
- Placid J. Podipara, Saint Thomas Christian historian
- Joseph Parecattil, the first Cardinal from the Syro-Malabar Church
- Joseph Powathil, Archbishop of Changanacherry and proponent of Syro-Malabar identity and traditions
- Emmanuel Thelly, orientalist and Syriacist, author of several books including a Syriac lexicon
- Antony Padiyara, first Major archbishop
- George Alencherry, first elected Major archbishop
- Koonammakkal Thomas, expert in Syro-Malabar history and Suriyani Malayalam and malpan (ecclesiastical teacher).

== Saints, Blesseds, Venerables and Servants of God ==
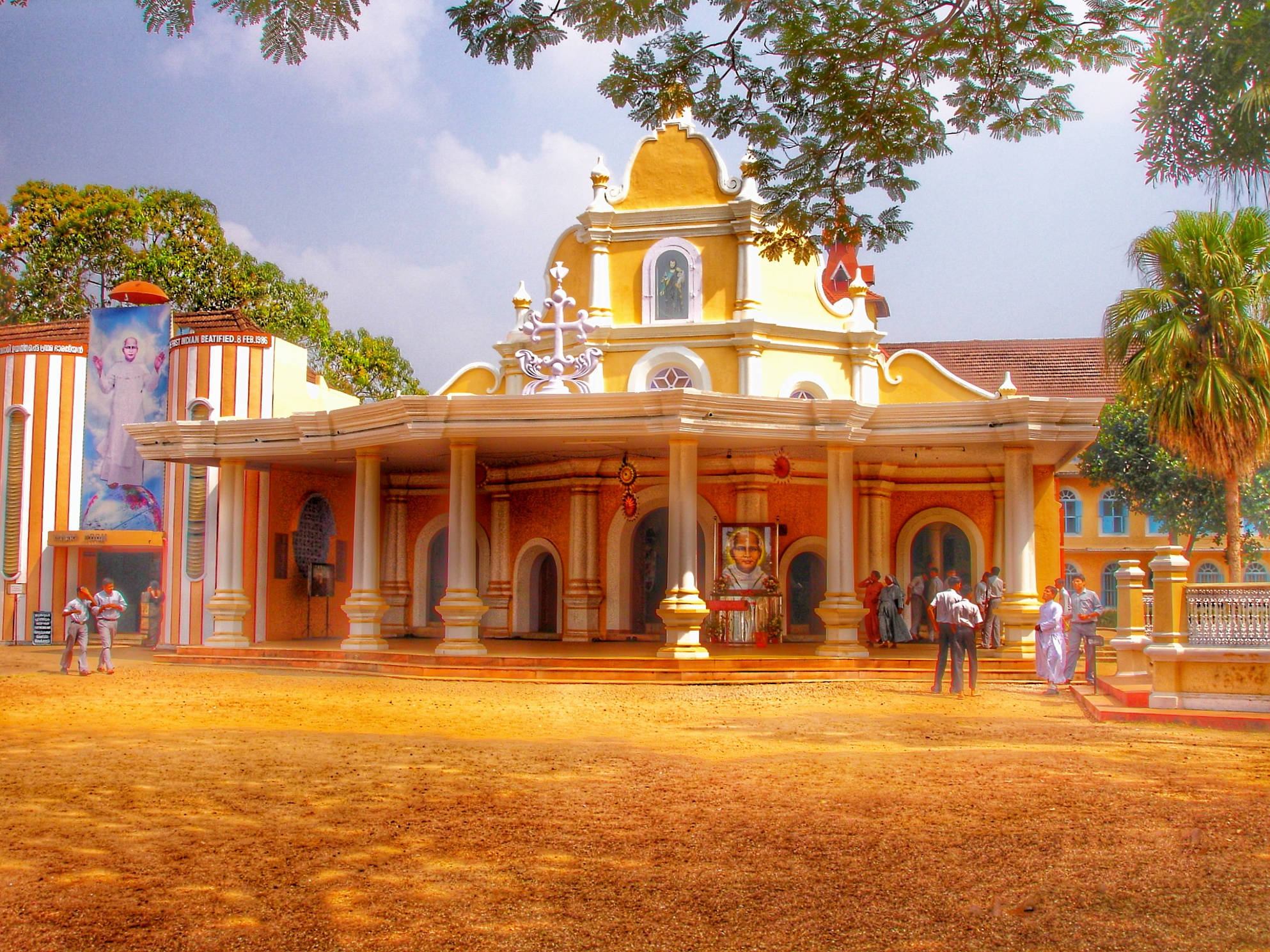
St. Joseph's Syro-Malabar Monastery Church, Mannanam, where the mortal remains of Kuriakose Elias Chavara are kept

=== Saints ===
- Marth Alphonsa Muttathupadathu – religious sister of FCC congregation
- Mar Kuriakose Chavara Kathanar – priest and one of the founding members of CMI
- Marth Euphrasia Eluvathingal – religious sister of CMC congregation
- Marth Mariam Thresia Chiramel – religious sister and founder of the Congregation of the Holy Family (CHF)

=== Blesseds ===
- Mar Thevarparambil Augustine Kathanar (Kunjachan) – priest of Pala (1891–1973)
- Marth Rani Maria Vattalil Sāhdhā – martyr and religious sister of the FCC congregation (1954–1995)

=== Venerables ===
- Payyappilly Varghese Kathanar – priest and founder of Sisters of the Destitute (1876–1929)
- Mar Thomas Kurialachery – first bishop of Changanassery and founder of The Congregation of the Sisters of the Adoration of the Blessed Sacrament (SABS) (1872–1925)
- Kadalikkattil Mathai Kathanar – priest and founder of the Sacred Heart Congregation (SH) (1872–1935)
- Vithayathil Joseph Kathanar – priest and co-founder of the Congregation of the Holy Family (CHF) (1865–1964)
- Ukken Augustine John Kathanar – priest and founder of Congregation of Sisters of Charity (CSC) (1880–1956)
- Maria Celine Kannanaikal – religious sister of UMI congregation (1931–1957)
- Mar Mathew Makkil – first vicar apostolic of Kottayam and the founder of Sisters of the Visitation of the Blessed Virgin Mary (SVM) (1851–1914)
- Panjikaran Joseph Kathanar – priest and founder of Medical Sisters of St. Joseph (MSJ) (1888–1949)

=== Servants of God ===
- Mar Mathew Kavukattu – first Archbishop of Changanassery (1904–1969)
- Poothathil Thomas Kathanar (Tommiyachan) – priest and founder of the Sisters of St. Joseph Congregation (SJC) (1871–1943)
- Thachuparambil Antony Kathanar – priest of Thrissur (1894–1963)
- Puthenparampil Thomas (Thommachen) – layman and founder member of Secular Franciscan Order (SFO) (1836–1908)
- Thekkekara Canisius Kathanar – priest and professed religious member of the CMI congregation (1914–1998)
- O. Fortunatus Thanhäuser – professed religious member of the Hospitaller Order of St John of God and founder of the congregation of the Sisters of Charity of St John of God (1918–2005)
- Mary Celine Payyappilly – religious sister of CMC congregation (1906–1993)
- Mary Francesca de Chantal Vallayil – religious sister and co-founderess of The Congregation of the Sisters of the Adoration of the Blessed Sacrament (SABS) (1880–1972)
- Msgr. Kandathil Joseph Kathanar – priest and founder of the Assisi Sisters of Mary Immaculate (ASMI) congregation (1904–1991)
- Kattarath Varkey Kathanar – priest and founder of the Vincentian Congregation (VC) (1851–1931)
- Fidelis Thaliath – religious sister of SD congregation (1929–2008)
- Kaniarakath Sebastian (Bruno) Kathanar – priest and professed religious member of the CMI congregation (1894–1991)
- Mary Collett Aarampulickal – religious sister of the FCC congregation (1904–1984)
- Madavath Armond Kathanar – priest and professed religious member of the Capuchin Order (OFM Cap)

== See also ==
- Liturgical calendar of the Syro-Malabar Catholic Church
- Sisters of the Destitute
- Carmelites of Mary Immaculate
- Congregation of Saint Thérèse of Lisieux
- All India Catholic Union
- Catholic Church in India

== Bibliography ==
- Amaladass, Anand (1993) [1989 (New York: Orbis Books)]. "Dialogue between Hindus and the St. Thomas Christians". In Coward, Harold (ed.). Hindu-Christian dialogue: perspectives and encounters (Indian ed.). Delhi: Motilal Banarsidass. ISBN 978-81-208-1158-4.
- ASSEMANI, Bibliotheca Orientalis (Rome, 1719–28); DE SOUZA.
- Brock, Sebastian P. (2011d). "Malabar Catholic Church". Gorgias Encyclopaedia of Syriac Heritage. Gorgias Press. Archived from the original on 8 December 2019.
- Orientale Conquistado (2 vols., Indian reprint, Examiner Press, Bombay).
- Gouvea, Antonio de (2003) [1606]. Malekandathil, Pius (ed.). Jornada of Dom Alexis de Menezes: A Portuguese Account of the Sixteenth Century Malabar. Kochi: L. R. C. Publications. ISBN 9788188979004..
- Fr. tr. De Glen, Histoire Orientale etc. (Brussels, 1609); DU JARRIC.
- Jarric, Pierre du (1615). Thesaurus rerum Indicarum. Sumptibus Petri Henningii..
- Paulinus, a. S. Bartholomaeo (1794). India Orientalis Christiana'. Typis Salomonianis.
- MacKenzie, Gordon Thomson (2008) [1st Pub. 1901]. Christianity in Travancore. Travancore Government Press. ISBN 9781230341651.
- Medlycott, Adolphus E. (1905). India and the Apostle Thomas: An Inquiry, with a Critical Analysis of the Acta Thomae.
- Thalian, George (1961). "The Great Archbishop Augustine W. Kandathil, D. D.: the Outline of a Vocation". Bp. Louis memorial press..
- Menachery G (1973) The St. Thomas Christian Encyclopedia of India Archived 3 January 2023 at the Wayback Machine, Ed. George Menachery, B.N.K. Press, vol. 2, ISBN 81-87132-06-X, Lib. Cong. Cat. Card. No. 73-905568; B.N.K. Press – (has some 70 lengthy articles by different experts on the origins, development, history, culture ... of these Christians, with some 300 odd photographs). Vol. 1, 1982. Vol. 3, 2010.
- Mundadan, A. Mathias. (1984) History of Christianity in India, vol. 1, Bangalore, India: Church History Association of India.
- Podipara, Placid J. (1970) "The Thomas Christians". London: Darton, Longman and Tidd, 1970. (is a readable and exhaustive study of the St. Thomas Christians.)
- Philip, E. M. (1908) The Indian Christians of St. Thomas (1908; Changanassery: Mor Adai Study Center, 2002).
- Aprem, Mar. (1977) The Chaldaean Syrian Church in India. Trichur, Kerala, India: Mar Narsai, 1977.
- Menachery, George (2000) Kodungallur – The Cradle of Christianity in India, Thrissur: Marthoma Pontifical Shrine.
- Menachery, George & Snaitang, Dr. Oberland (2012)"India's Christian Heritage". The Church History Association of India, Dharmaram College, Bangalore.
- Acts of St. Thomas (Syriac) MA. Bevan, London, 1897
- Tisserant, Eugene (1957). Hambye, E. R. (ed.). Eastern Christianity in India: A History of the Syro-Malabar Church from the Earliest Times to the Present Day. Westminster: Newman Press.
- Michael Geddes, (1694) A Short History of the Church of Malabar together with the Synod of Diamper, London. Ed. Prof. George Menachery in the Nazranies i.e. The Indian Church History Classics I, 1998.
- Puthur, B. (ed.) (2002), The Life and Nature of the St Thomas Christian Church in the Pre-Diamper Period (Cochi, Kerala).
- T.K Velu Pillai, (1940) "The Travancore State Manual"; 4 volumes; Trivandrum
- Menachery G (ed); (1998) "The Indian Church History Classics", Vol. I, The Nazranies, Ollur, 1998. ISBN 81-87133-05-8.
- Menachery, George. Glimpses of Nazraney Heritage.SARAS 2005 Ollur.
- Palackal, Joseph J. Syriac Chant Traditions in South India. PhD, Ethnomusicology, City University of New York, 2005.
- Joseph, T. K. The Malabar Christians and Their Ancient Documents. Trivandrum, India, 1929.
- Leslie Brown, (1956) The Indian Christians of St. Thomas. An Account of the Ancient Syrian Church of Malabar, Cambridge: Cambridge University Press 1956, 1982 (repr.)
- Thomas P. J; (1932) "Roman Trade Centres in Malabar", Kerala Society Papers II.
- Marco Polo.(1298) LATHAM, R. (TRANSL.) "The Travels" Penguin Classics 1958
- Bjorn Landstrom (1964) "The Quest for India", Doubleday (publisher) English Edition, Stockholm.
- Francis Eluvathingal (ed), Syro-Malabar Church Since the Eastern Code, Mary Matha Publications, Trichur, 2003.
- Francis Eluvathingal, "Patriarchal and Major Archiepiscopal Curia in the Eastern Catholic Legislation based on CCEO Canons 114–125" ORISI, Kottayam, 2009.
- Roman Documents on the Syro-Malabar Liturgy. Issue 213 of Oriental Institute of Religious Studies, India. Kottayam: Oriental Institute of Religious Studies. 1999. ISBN 81-86063-49-8.
- Brock, Sebastian P. (2011a). "Thomas Christians". In Sebastian P. Brock; Aaron M. Butts; George A. Kiraz; Lucas Van Rompay (eds.). Gorgias Encyclopedic Dictionary of the Syriac Heritage: Electronic Edition. Gorgias Press. Archived from the original on 7 March 2022.
- Menon, A. Sreedhara (1965). "Portuguese and the Malabar Church". Kerala District Gazetteers: Ernakulam. Trivandrum: The Superintendent of Government Presses, Government Press: 128, 131–144. Archived from the original on 11 February 2022.
- Brown, Leslie W. (1956). The Indian Christians of St Thomas: An Account of the Ancient Syrian Church of Malabar. Cambridge: Cambridge University Press. Archived from the original on 2 February 2024.
- Mingana, Alphonse (1926). "The Early Spread of Christianity in India" (PDF). Bulletin of the John Rylands Library. 10 (2): 435–514. doi:10.7227/BJRL.10.2.7. Archived (PDF) from the original on 24 January 2021.
- Neill, Stephen (2004) [1984]. A History of Christianity in India: The Beginnings to AD 1707. Cambridge: Cambridge University Press. ISBN 9780521548854. Archived from the original on 18 October 2023.
- Mundadan, Mathias (1967). The Arrival of the Portuguese in India and the Thomas Christians Under Mar Jacob, 1498–1552. Bangalore: Dharmaram College. Archived from the original on 2 February 2024.
- Habbi, Joseph (1966). "Signification de l'union chaldéenne de Mar Sulaqa avec Rome en 1553". L'Orient Syrien. 11: 99–132, 199–230. Archived from the original on 3 August 2023.
- Vellian, Jacob (2001). "The Synod of Diamper and the Liturgy of the Syro-Malabar Church". In Nedungatt, George (ed.). The Synod of Diamper Revisisted. Pontificio Istituto Orientale. pp. 173–198. ISBN 8872103312.
- Wilmshurst, David (2000). The Ecclesiastical Organisation of the Church of the East, 1318–1913. Louvain: Peeters Publishers. ISBN 9789042908765. Archived from the original on 2 August 2023.
