= Kuncheria Pathil =

Indian theologian

Kuncheria Pathil (born 25 September 1939) is an Indian theologian belonging to the Carmelites of Mary Immaculate. Died 06 October 2022.

== Early life ==
Pathil was born to Varkey Ouseph and Mariam at Kannady in Alappuzha District. His native parish is Kavalam of Changanacherry Archieparchy. He had his primary education in St.Joseph's High School, Pulinkunnu. Then he joined Carmelites of Mary Immaculate . He was ordained a priest on 17 May 1967.

== Education ==
He holds degrees in philosophy and theology. He obtained his master's degree and doctorate in theology from the Katholieke Universiteit Leuven, Belgium in 1979.

== Professor and Expert ==
Pathil started his teaching career as a professor of theology at Dharmaram College, Bangalore in 1979. He was the dean of the faculty of theology of the same college in 1992 to 1997. He served as the Secretary of the Indian Theological Association (1980–86). Then he became the President of Indian Theological Association (1989–92). He is a Member of the CBCI Doctrinal Commission. He is also a Member of the Asian Ecumenical Committee of FABC (1996). Presently he is the provincial of the Trivandrum province of the Carmelites of Mary Immaculate.

== Major works ==
Models in Ecumenical Dialogue (1981) and Indian Churches at the Cross roads (1995) are his major works.

== Sources ==
CMI Directory
