= Carmelites of Mary Immaculate =

Female congregation in the Syro-Malabar Church of India

- Congregatio Fratrum Carmelitarum Beatae Virginis Mariae Immaculatae
- Abbreviation: CMI
- Formation: 11 May 1831 (195 years ago)
- Founders: Palackal Thoma, CMI; Kuriakose Elias Chavara, CMI; Thomas Porukara, CMI
- Type: Clerical religious congregation of pontifical right for men
- Headquarters: St. Joseph's, Monastery Road, Kochi, Kerala, India
- Members: 2,692 members (includes 2,007 priests) as of 2020
- Prior General: Fr. Paul Achandy, C.M.I.
- Parent organization: Syro-Malabar Catholic Church.
- Website: cmi.org.in
- Formerly called: Servants of Mary Immaculate (Malayalam: അമലോത്ഭവ ദാസ സംഘം)

The Carmelites of Mary Immaculate (Latin: Congregatio Fratrum Carmelitarum Beatae Virginis Mariae Immaculatae) abbreviated CMI, formerly also known as the Servants of Mary Immaculate (Malayalam: അമലോത്ഭവ ദാസ സംഘം), is a Catholic clerical religious congregation of pontifical right for men of the Syro-Malabar Catholic Church, and is the largest such congregation in the Syro-Malabar Church.

It was founded on 11 May 1831, by Indian priests Thomas Palackal, Thomas Porukara, and Kuriakose Elias Chavara who were priests of the Apostolic Church of Saint Thomas Christians in India. Brother Jacob Kanianthara was inspired by the vision of the founding fathers and served them in the foundation of the congregation. The core charism of congregation is contemplata et aliis tradere (to share with others the fruits of contemplation). The Identity and heritage of the Congregation is reflected in its triple roots of spirituality namely Indian, Eastern and Carmelite. The Congregation is involved in pastoral works consisting of teaching at all levels, taking care of aged and sick, apostolate of press, running several mission dioceses both in India and abroad.

The original vision of the founders was to begin a House of Vision (ദർശന വീട്) for priests rooted in Christian and Indian spirituality by combining contemplation and service, especially spiritual guidance with sannyasic elements. It was based on their understanding that "a lot of good had not been done due to the absence of a House of Contemplation (തപസ് ഭവനം ) and a House of Vision (ദർശന വീട്)." The influence of the Vicar Apostolic of Verapoly, who was a Carmelite resulted in the orientation towards Carmelite order and spirituality. The Congregation was affiliated to the Carmelite Order as a Religious Congregation of the Oriental Rite and assumed the name Third Order of Carmelites Discalced in 1860. Pontifical status was granted in 1885. The Congregation changed its name to Carmelites of Mary Immaculate in 1958. The Congregation was given Pontifical Exemption in 1967.

As of 2020, the Congregation has 2,692 members with 1 Archbishop, 7 Bishops, 2007 priests. Associates of CMI (ACMI) support the missionary activities of the congregation in different ways.

== History ==
=== Foundation ===
The initial idea of leading a hermetic life came up in the minds of Malpan Thomas Porukara and Malpan Thomas Palackal. They approached the then Vicar Apostolic Bishop Mourelius Stabilini for permission to establish a religious congregation. Permission was not grant them by the Bishop, who cited three reasons namely the difficulty to begin a congregation, difficulty to get financial resources to maintain and continue it. Later, Bishop Mourelius Stabilini changed his decision and said, "If both of you priests, who are intelligent and prudent, are going to lead a life of silence and solitude, then who will teach the people? If you want, you can start a monastery. It will be useful for you and also for others." He approved their request and gave them Rs. 200 to begin the monastic life. The permission was granted by Vicar Apostolic Msgr Stabilini to start a religious house for the following purposes: (1) Educating the uneducated, (2) Helping them who desire to enter the Catholic Church, (3) Working for the reunion of the separated brethren, (4) Safeguarding the well being of all, (5) Aiming at the renewal of the Church, and (6) Willing to do all that are seen good for the people of God.

The first monastery of CMI congregation was established on 11 May 1831 at Mannanam, Kerala, India. The foundation stone was laid by Malpan Thomas Porukara in the presence of Vicar Apostolic - Bishop Mourelius Stabilini, the local ordinary, Malpan Thomas Palackal and Kuriakose Elias Chavara. The founders of the congregation namely Thomas Porukara, Thomas Palackal and Kuriakose Elias Chavara were assisted by Jacob Kaniathara. Jacob Kanianthara became the first professed 'brother' in the Congregation. Geevarghese Thoppil was the first to join the new religious movement. Several priests and young men from then on started to join the religious movement started at Mannanam.

On 8 December 1855, the Mannanam community was recognised canonically with the profession of vows of eleven priests headed by Kuriakose Elias Chavara, the first prior of the congregation. The original name of the movement was Servants of Mary Immaculate (അമലോത്ഭവ ദാസ സംഘം). In 1860, this congregation was affiliated to the Carmelite Order and its members began to use the postnominal initials of TOCD (Third Order of Discalced Carmelites). The Congregation grew leaps and bounds with the addition of new members and establishing of six more monasteries in a decade.

Kuriakose Elias Chavara governed the Congregation for 16 years as its Superior General under the name "Common Prior". There was only one Prior until 1885 and the monasteries were headed by his vicars. The constitution of the Congregation were approved for the first time by the Holy See in 1885 thus the Congregation became juris pontific (pontifical right) The Congregation was headed by Prior General's from outside the congregation (Bishops) and their delegates from 1885 to 1902. It was from then that head of each monastery was called Prior. The title Prior General was used for the elected member who headed the Congregation. In 1902, the General Chapter convened by Bishop Bernard, the Prior General was directed by the Holy See to elect the Prior General from within the Congregation. Thus Alexander Kattakayam was elected Prior General. The practice of electing Prior Generals from among the members of Congregation continues till date. The final approbation for Constitution was received in 1906. The congregation was divided into three provinces in 1953. The current name Carmelites of Mary Immaculate was received in 1958. The congregation was raised to one of pontifical right in 1967 by Pope Paul VI.

== Founders of the Congregation ==
Thomas Palackal (1775-1841)

The senior most among the three founders was Palackal Thomas who shared his vision of a religiius congregation to his friend Thomas Porukara and Kuriakose Chavara. Thomas Palackal was ordained priest in 1807. He was involved in the training and formation of the priests as a Malpan (professor of sacred sciences) of the Church. He was an aesthetic dedicated to penance, prayer and study. He lived a community life with his students, joining them in their spiritual exercises and sitting with them for study. What he had in mind as a spiritual ideal was a sort of Dominican way of life. The Dominican spirit was understood as to teach and proclaim what has been learned from sacred reading, subjecting it to deep meditation, or to study, prayer and teaching (Contemplata praedicare). Since books on theology, scripture and morals were not available in Syriac and Malayalam he collected Tamil books on these topics and copied them down, studied and translated a few of them into Malayalam. Palackal died on 16 January 1841 at the age of 66 and was buried in the parish church at Pallipuram.

=== Thomas Porukara (1799-1846) ===
Porukara was ordained on 22 September 1823. In his priestly ministry in the parish, he made earnest effort to renew the life of the people in the parish. He set apart the Saturdays for the destitute and other homeless beggars to help them in their material deprivation and to give them spiritual guidance and sacramental assistance. It was Porukara who laid the foundation stone of the monastery at Mannanam on 11 May 1831 and the name of St Joseph was proposed by Porukara and all agreed to his proposal, though the Bishop and Palackal had their own views. Porukara had special devotion to St Joseph which he developed in Mannanam in 1843 and popularized the devotional practice of giving meal and clothing to parents and a child from an indigent family on Wednesdays in the month of March. Since the beginning of the monastery at Mannanam in 1831, practically Porukara was the Superior of the community as most of the time Palackal was at Pallipuram with his seminarians. Porukara died on 8 January 1846.

=== Kuriakose Elias Chavara (1805-1871) ===
Kuriakose Elias Chavara was born on 10 February 1805 in Kainakary. In 1818, at the age of 13, he joined the seminary at Pallipuram under the tutelage of Malpan Thomas Palackal. During the early years of his studies Chavara lost his parents and his lone brother and he was compelled to return home to preserve his father's family tradition. But he solved the family and vocation crisis and continued his priestly studies and was ordained a priest on 29 November 1829 at the age of 24 by Msgr. Maurelius Stabilini at Arthunkal. It is recorded in the Chronicle that the main personal intention of Chavara in the first Holy Mass was the realization of the establishment of a religious house for priests at the earliest. His priestly ministry for 40 years shows an indomitable spiritual power embellishing the Church.

He collaborated with Thomas Palackal and Porukara in the establishment of the first indigenous religious house for men at Mannanam in 1831. After the death of Thomas Palackal in 1841 and Thomas Porukara in 1846, he led the congregation from the front. On 8 December 1855 on the first anniversary of the official proclamation of the dogma of the Immaculate Conception of Blessed Mother, Kuriakose made the profession of religious vows, adopting the name Kuriakose Elias of Holy Family. Then, his ten companions made their religious vows before him, himself being appointed the superior of the new religious community. The new religious community was known at that time as Servants of Mary Immaculate. It was Kuriakose who introduced the term Mary Immaculate in the name of the congregation. Later, from 1858, by the influence of the Carmelite missionaries, the community began to be known as Servants of Mary Immaculate of Carmel.

Kuriakose Elias Chavara established the first Syro-Malabar common seminary in 1833 at Mannanam, which continued up to 1894 and, then, got amalgamated to the Puthenpally seminary. He became the first Vicar General in the Syrian Church after the time of archdeacon in 1861. He implemented the idea of "a school for a church" in the Syrian churches when he was the Vicar General in 1864. He took pains to unify and codify the Syriac Divine Office, liturgical rubrics, calendar in the Malabar Church, etc. In 2008, Cardinal Varkey Vithayathil, former Major Archbishop of the Syro-Malabar Archiepiscopal Church, wrote: "It is mostly thanks to Blessed Chavara's tireless and committed efforts that the Syro-Malabar Church is what she is today. The practical wisdom and common sense with which he introduced reform in the fields of liturgy, priestly training and pastoral ministry certainly provide us with unfailing guidelines even today in similar endeavours. He also presented well thought out proposal for regaining and maintaining Church's autonomy and identity, which would even facilitate the reunion of the separated brethren". He initiated spiritual reforms by starting 40 hour adoration, way of the cross, and various Marian devotional practices.

In the midst of diverse and manifold activities, he found time and leisure to write a few books, both in prose and in verse, like Atmanuthapam (The Lamentations of a Repentant Soul-a poem), Marana-Veettil Padunnathinulla Pana (A Poem to Sing in the Bereaved House), Anasthaciayude Rakthasakshyam (The Martyrdom of Anasthacia), Dhyana Sallapangal (Colloquies in Mediation) and Nalagamangal (Historical Notes as Chronicles). He took initiative in codifying the liturgical books like canonical prayers for priests and prepared the liturgical rubrics called Thukkasa, liturgical calendar, Solemn Sung Mass, Little Office of the Blessed Virgin Mary and Office for the Dead. His Eclogues are 10 Shepherd Plays related to the birth of Jesus Christ. His counsels to the Christian families given in 1868 in the form of the "Testament of a Loving Father" are universally applicable and are relevant to this day even after 150 years. As an instruction manual for families, already lakhs of copies in 32 editions were circulated among the Christian families. He started catechumenates attached to Mannanam and other monasteries and many received faith and joined the Catholic Church.

He is the founder of the first Catholic printing press in India. It was a crude hand made wooden press which produced the first Malayalam daily newspaper called Nasrani Deepika. On 15 April 1987, India's first Malayalam daily newspaper was first published.

He was known for his personal holiness and was acclaimed popularly as a true mirror of virtues. "God's will always and everywhere" was his mantra and his intense Abba experience enabled him to trust in the Providence of God. Chavara used to spend long hours in adoration before the Eucharistic Lord and promoted the Eucharistic and Marian devotions. In October 1870, he became very sick; he was totally blind for about three months. Sensing the imminent death of the founder members, the community assembled around him in tears at his deathbed on the eve of 2 January 1871. Then, he told to them in a feeble voice: "Why are you very sad and are crying? Every man, however high he is, has to die one day. Now it is my time. As I had always the protection of the Holy Family, I have never lost the baptismal grace" and, then, he entrusted the Congregation and all the members to the protection of the Holy family. He died on 3 January 1871 after a painful illness. Though his canonization process began in 1955 and the process was officially declared in 1957. On 7 April 1984, Chavara was declared Venerable and on 8 February 1986, Pope John Paul II, declared him Blessed. Pope Francis canonized him a saint on 24 November 2014. The feast falls on 3 January.

=== Jacob Kaniyanthara (1800-1898) ===
Jacob Kaniyanthara collaborated with the founding fathers. The congregation venerates him as the one who initiated, shared and shaped the charism and vocation of the congregation together with the founding fathers. He was admitted to the profession in 1865. Since the congregation in the beginning was conceived to be one for the priests only, he had to wait long to be formally admitted to the religious community. In Bro Jacob, the congregation finds a luminous example of a virgin soul, which always patiently kept the light of faith ever shining with the oil of hope for the emulation and admiration of the future members. He died at the age of 98 in 1898 and was buried in Mannanam.

=== First monasteries ===
Six new monasteries were founded: St. Philomena's Monastery, Koonammavu (1857), St. Mary's Monastery, Elthuruth near Trichur (1858), Carmel Monastery, Vazhakulam near Muvattupuzha (1859), St. Sebastian's Monastery, Pulinkunnu (1861), St. Theresa's Monastery, Ambazhakad (1868), and St. John of the Cross Monastery, Mutholy (1870).

== Contributions to the Church ==
=== Retreat preaching ===
Retreat preaching was one of the main apostolate of CMI congregation in the beginning. It was instrumental in the introduction of annual retreats for priests and laity in the Syro-Malabar Catholic Church. The members of the congregation used to go in groups of two or three to different parishes in Kerala to preach retreats. The monastic rules were made flexible so that they could return to the monastery some months later after preaching retreats in different parishes. The mission of retreat preaching was supported by Bishop Luduevicos who sent a circular to all parishes of vicariate instructing them to invite the religious priests from mannanam to preach retreats in their parishes. The annual retreats for priests were conducted in the monasteries of Mannanam and Elthurth.

=== Systematizing liturgy and introducing devotional practices ===
The CMI congregation was involved in the radical renewal of the Church by systematizing liturgy and introducing devotional practices. The systematization of liturgy consists of mainly systematizing the liturgical celebrations. Kuriakose Elias Chavara played a significant role in this regard. He wrote a number of liturgical texts that played an important role in reforming liturgy. They include the Divine office for priests, Divine office for the dead, office of the Blessed virgin Mary, prayers of various blessings, the order of Holy mass - Tukasa, liturgical calendar, forty hours adoration and prayer books for laymen.

The members of the congregation paid visits to the laity, instructing them by visiting families, Sunday homilies, Preparing children for first holy communion and above all popularizing devotional practices which were practiced in the global church. The spiritual outcome of such an effort could be found in The Syro-Malabar Church who are blessed with three saints, three blesseds, four venerables and ten servant of Gods.

==== Papal honour ====
Alexander Kattakayam was honoured by Pope Leo XIII with the title MISSIONARY APOSTOLIC in 1892. The same pope endowed him with yet another title CROCE DI BENEMERENZA in 1903. Alexander was remarkable preacher and was attentive of the pastoral needs of parishes. He is credited with introducing the first holy communion service in the Syro-Malabar Catholic Church. B Charles Levinjnue once prophesied, "Fr. Chandy will die while preaching" These words were fulfilled when Alexander fell ill while preaching retreat at Thidanad and died.

=== Seminary formation ===
The system formation of priests in Syro-Malabar Catholic Church was called Malpanate system. The three founding fathers of the CMI congregation were Malpans or teachers involved in priestly formation. They were instrumental in systematizing the seminary formation and thus they began the first common seminary of Syro-Malabar Catholic Church in Mannanam in 1831. It could accommodate 150 seminarians. It functioned till 1894 and was later joined with major seminary at Puthenpally. The seminaries were founded attached to monasteries in Vazhakulam (1866), Elthuruth (1868) and Pulincunnu (1872). The priests who received formation in these seminaries were instrumental in thwarting the threat raised by Roccosian and Melusian Schism.

=== Apologetics ===
When the Syro-Malabar Catholic Church was facing the threat of schisms of Bishop Roccos (1861) and Bishop Melus (18740), the CMIs were in forefront to unite the Church and defend faith. During the period when Kuriakose Elias Chavara was the Vicar General of the Syro-Malabar Church, he divided the Syrian parishes into zones and members of CMI congregation were entrusted to assist in taking care of the faithful in the parishes especially with regard to pastoral services, functioning of Sunday schools, conducting retreats. The members of the congregation was aware of the identity of Syro-Malabar Catholic Church which was under the Latin Church. Many letters were written to Rome pleading for bishops from the Syro-Malabar Church and also for freedom in liturgical worship. The congregation had to pay heavy price for such an act with seven members were expelled for writing letters to Rome. The only reason for expulsion being asking for separate Bishops for Syrians without the consent of vicar apostolic of Verapoly. One of the seven, Aloysius Pazheparambil (Louis Pazheparampil), became the first bishop of the Vicariate of Ernakulam in 1896.

=== Reunion movement ===
The Coonan Cross Oath resulted in the division of Syro-Malabar Catholic Church. Kuriakose Elias Chavara and members of the CMI congregation were instrumental in bringing the separated Jacobite brethren back to the Catholic fold. Letters were written by Kuriakose Elias Chavara to Rome in 1896 requesting separate Bishops for Syrians and Latins which would create an ambient atmosphere for the return of the Jacobites. Chavara had also written letters to Jacobite to attend the First Vatican Council held between 1869 and 1870 which was encouraged by the Pope too. Yet another significant name in the reunion movement is Mathai Mariam Palakunnel. Together with other members of the CMI Congregation he worked among Jacobites in Kollam, Kottar, Pandalam, Kottarakara, Adoor, Chenganur etc. He also established Ashrams in prominent Jacobite centers such as Ayroor and Puthupally. Based in the major seminary in Chethipuzha, Fathers Stephan Thayil, Hyacinth Kunnumkal, Gregory Neerakal, Ignatius Puthanpurackal were the leading lights of the 20th century re-union movement. Yet another notable member of the CMI congregation was Placid J. Podipara who also played a key role in the re-union of Geevarghese Ivanios (Mar Ivanios) and Mar Teophilos towards the establishment of Syro-Malankara Catholic Church.

=== Contribution to society ===
A Sanskrit school was started in Mannanam in 1846; the St. Ephraim English school was begun there in 1890 and converted to a high school in 1903. Similarly in 1844, the first printing press in the Syro-Malabar Church was started at Mannanam. Deepika, the first newspaper of Kerala, was begun at Mannanam in 1887. After running it for more than a century, it was handed over to a registered company. In June 2023, Carmelites started a school for the marginalised in Dhangadhi.

=== Global mission ===
The CMI Congregation began its global mission in 1938 with the Iran Mission. The Iraq mission was undertaken in 1960. The priests worked in parishes and seminary formation. The missions to Europe and North America too began in the 1960s with involvement in pastoral ministry. The focus was shifted to Africa with the opening of Peru mission in 1975. In 1977 Missions were opened in South America and Kenya. Gradually missions were opened in African countries like Madagascar, Ghana, Botswana, Tanzania, Namibia and South American countries like Argentina, Chile, Ecuador and Paraguay. The priests also serve in Australia, Philippines and in Indonesia.

== Organisation ==
There are 15 provinces in the CMI Congregation.

The congregation has about 3,000 members from Syro-Malabar, Syro-Malankara and Latin rites from India and Kenya with 10 bishops, 1917 priests, 19 lay brothers and 1200 brothers in formation. The priests are actively involved in pastoral services in 30 countries around the world.

=== Leadership ===
A Prior General, with a team of four general Councilors, and a general auditor administer the congregation. A General Chapter of the congregation elects them every six years. As of August 2020, the Prior General is Father Thomas C Mathew, C.M.I.

List of Priors General
Name of Prior General	Start date	End date	Notes
Paul Achandy, CMI	2026		
Thomas C Mathew, CMI	2020	2026	
Paul Achandy, CMI	2014	2020	
Jose Panthaplamthottiyil, CMI	2008	2014	
Anthony Kariyil, CMI	2002	2008	Later ordained Bishop of Mandya
Alex Ukken, CMI	1996	2002	
Thomas Mampra, CMI	1990	1996	
Vijay Anand Nedumpuram, CMI	1985	1990	Later ordained Bishop of Chanda
Thomas Aykara, CMI	1978	1985	
Theobald Pothanikkad, CMI	1972	1978	
Canisius Thekkekara CMI	1966	1972	Declared Servant of God
Maurus Valiyaparampil, CMI	1953	1966	
Vincent Alappatt, CMI	1947	1952	
John Berchmans Koithara, CMI	1941	1947	
Bartholomew Perumalil, CMI	1936	1941	
Silvester Thattil, CMI.	1933	1936	
John Berchmans Koithara, CMI	1926	1933	
Bartholomew Perumalil, CMI	1936	1941	
Silvester Thattil, CMI	1933	1936	
John Berchmans Koithara, CMI	1926	1933	
Louis Neriamparampil, CMI	1923	1926	
Alexander Kattakayam, CMI	1920	1923	
Gabriel Pulickal, CMI	1917	1920	
Alexander Kattakayam, CMI	1914	1917	Honoured by Pope Leo XIII with titles Missionary Apostolic (1892) and CROCE DI BENEMERENZA (1903).
Basil Thaliath, CMI	1908	1914	
Alexander Kattakayam, CMI	1902	1908	Honoured by Pope Leo XIII with titles Missionary Apostolic (1892) and CROCE DI BENEMERENZA (1903).
Archbishop Bernard of Jesus Arginzonis y Astobiza, OCD	1892	1902	
Archbishop Ladislaus Michael Zaleski	1892	1892	Later Patriarch of Antioch
Cardinal Giovanni Simeoni	1891	1892	
Archbishop Andrea Aiuti	1887	1891	Later Cardinal
Marcellino Berardi, OCD	1885	1887	
Kuriakose Eliseus Porukara, CMI	1871	1885	
Kuriakose Elias Chavara	1855	1871	

== See also ==
- Abel Periyappuram
- Darsanalaya Ashram
- The Indian Priest
- Kurian Kachapally
- Mar Gregory Karotemprel
- Kuncheria Pathil
- Placid J. Podipara
