= Palackal Thoma =

Indian Catholic priest (1780–1841)

Mar Palackal Thoma Malpan C.M.I.

Founder
- Born: c. 1780; Pallippuram, Kerala, India
- Died: 16 January 1841 (aged 60–61); Pallippuram, Kerala, India
- Venerated in: Syro-Malabar Church

Palackal Thoma Malpan (c. 1780–1841) was an Indian Catholic priest of the Syro-Malabar Church based in India. He was the senior priest and founder who envisaged the formation of the first native religious institution in India, Carmelites of Mary Immaculate also known as C.M.I. (the first native religious institute of the Eastern Catholic Church), and the founder of the first seminary for Syro-Malabar Catholics.

== Life ==
=== Palackal Family ===
Palackal Thoma was born to the Palackal family, about 1780 in the village of Pallippuram, an ancient Christian priestly family in Kerala that trace their origin as Jewish lineage who were baptized by Thomas the Apostle, a disciple of Jesus Christ at Kottakkavu, North Paravoor. Most Christians in Kerala are known as Syrian Christians in view of the Syriac (classical form of Aramaic) liturgy used in church services since the early days of Christianity in India. They are also known as "Nasrani" (followers of Jesus the Nazarene).

Pallippuram, is now part of the state of Kerala, then in the Kingdom of Travancore.

Thoma Palackal felt a call to the Christian ministry, for which he pursued theological studies under a noted priest of the Syrian Church, Abraham Thachil. He received Holy Orders in 1807.

After Palackal's ordination he was named as Secretary for the Saint Thomas Christians and a councilor to the Vicariate Apostolic of Malabar (now the Roman Catholic Archdiocese of Verapoly), Raimundo di San Giuseppe Roviglia, who led them in the name of the Holy See in Rome. He would serve as a councilor to the Apostolic Vicariate for the rest of his life.

As a major leader of Syrian Catholic Church in India, Palackal introduced many Western practices among his people. These included the use of a Roman style white cassock by the clergy, in order to distinguish them from the clergy of the Jacobite Christians. Additionally, the use of a confessional and a graveyard with boundary wall were mandated for all churches and confraternities were established for the greater participation of the laity in church services.

=== Educator and founder ===
Palackal returned to his hometown in 1818. After settling there, he found several young men who asked him to train them for the priesthood. He then opened a small seminary for this purpose. Among his first students was Kuriakose Chavara, who would later join him in forming the first religious congregation in the Syro-Malabar Church. They developed a paternal bond which lasted his whole life.

Palackal insisted on the rigorous development of both soul and mind in his seminary. For the first, he wrote a Rule of life for the seminarians which was a strict routine of prayer and fasting. For the latter, he taught himself Tamil so that he could translate the best spiritual resources printed in that language by the Jesuits into their native Malayalam language for the benefit of his students.

Palackal seems to have long held a desire for life in a religious community similar to that of the Discalced Carmelites who led the Catholic faith in that region. He was joined in this by his student, Chavara. They found another like-minded priest of the Vicariate, Thomas Porukkara. In 1831 they were given the permission of the Coadjutor Vicar Apostolic, Maurelio Stabellini, to establish a religious community. The Monastery of St. Joseph was then founded in Mannanam on 11 May of that year. The small community called themselves the "Servants of Mary Immaculate" and lived under the Rule of the Discalced Third Order. In 1833 Palackal moved his seminary there to train the clergy of both the Vicariate and his new community.

=== Death ===
Palackal died in his native city on 16 January 1841. He was buried in the main altar of Pallippuram St. Mary's Church.

== Legacy ==
Chavara went on to found the Carmelites of Mary Immaculate in 1855, after the death of his mentor. Today they serve the members of the Syro-Malabar Church around the world.
