= Pallippuram, Alappuzha =

Pallippuram
- Village
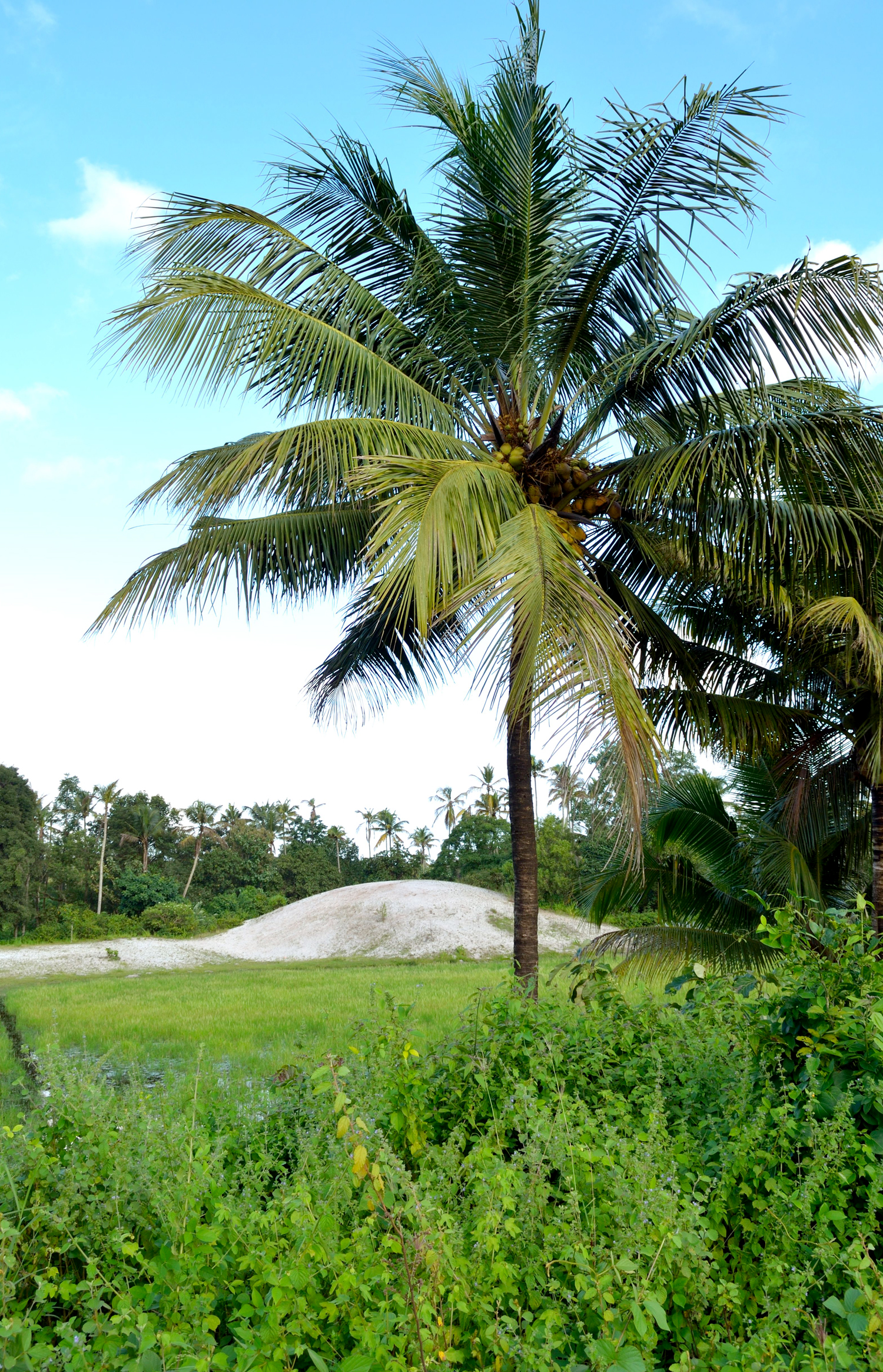
- The white sand dunes, a typical sight around Pallipuram

- Location in Kerala, India Pallippuram (India)
- Coordinates: 9.7566°N 76.3607°E
- Country: India
- State: Kerala
- District: Alappuzha

Area
  - Total: 25.53 km^{2} (9.86 sq mi)

Population (2001)
  - Total: 27,307
  - Density: 1,070/km^{2} (2,770/sq mi)

Languages
  - Official: Malayalam, English
- Time zone: UTC+5:30 (IST)
- PIN: 688
- Telephone code: 0478
- Vehicle registration: KL-32, KL-04
- Sex ratio: 1043 ♂/1000 ♀
- Lok Sabha constituency: Alappuzha
- Kerala Niyamasabha constituency: Aroor

Pallippuram (also called South Pallipuram/Chennam Pallippuram ) is a village located 7 kilometres (4.3 mi) from Cherthala in the Alappuzha district of the Indian state of Kerala.

== Geography ==
A serene village, it is wedged between Cherthala Municipality and the Thycattussery Panchayat. The settlement is surrounded by water on three sides - in the east and west by Vembanad Lake and in the south by the Chenganda River. A bridge provides access to mainland Cherthala while boats and ferry service to Vaikom are also available.

Pallippuram is noted for its whitish sand (due to the high silica content), which has extensive use in the glass and cement industries. Malabar Cements (a fully owned Government of Kerala undertaking) has a major industrial unit operating out of the Industrial Growth Centre at Pallippuram. Pallippuram Info Park is a major IT company in Kerala. The Mega Seafood Park under KSIDC is located in the industrial area of Pallippuram.

== Places of worship ==
A major landmark in the village is Pallipuram St.mary's Forane Church, built in the 3rd century AD. Palackal Thoma Malpan was born and lived here, heading a Seminary (1818–1855) for teaching priests, the first such run by the St. Thomas Christians, and the antecedent of St. Joseph's Seminary, Mannanam (1833–1894), with which it later merged.

Pallippuram Kadavil Sree Mahalakshmi Temple is famous for Every Year Makam Thozhal In Malayala Month Kumbham.

== Celebrities ==
Nadakkal Parameswaran Pillai, the founder of the Indian Coffee House chain in Kerala, was a native of Pallippuram.

== See also ==
- Kottoor Church
