= Saint Thomas Christians =

Indian ethnoreligious group

Saint Thomas Christians (മാർ തോമാ നസ്രാണി)
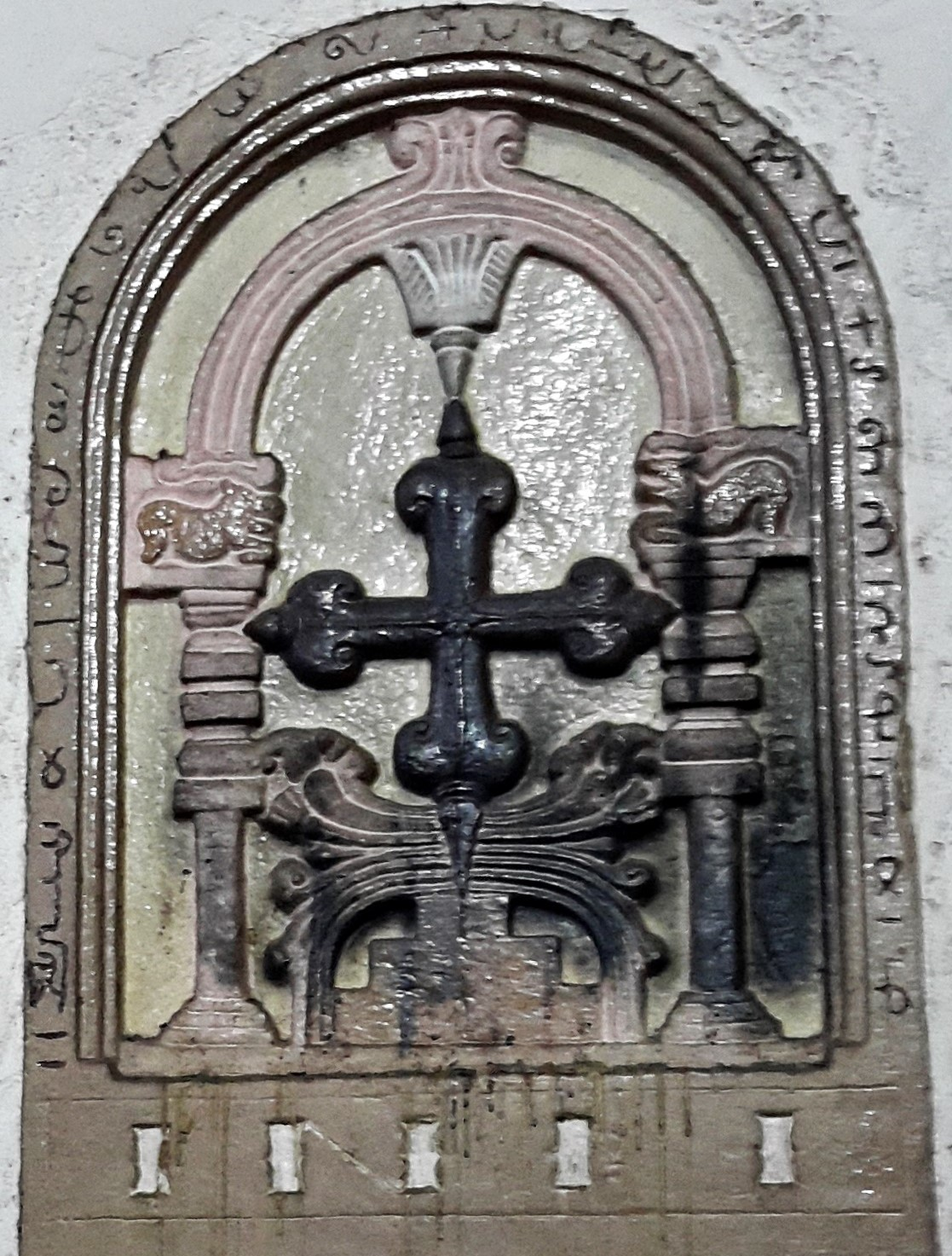
- Saint Thomas cross

Total population
- Approx. 6,000,000 (2018)

Regions with significant populations
- India (Kerala, Chennai, Bengaluru, Mumbai); UAE (Dubai); Oman; Kuwait; USA (New York metropolitan area, Chicago, Houston, Dallas, Tampa, Detroit, Atlanta, Philadelphia, New Jersey, Los Angeles, San Francisco Bay Area); Canada (Toronto, Edmonton, Whitehorse); UK (London, Birmingham); The Netherlands (Amsterdam)

Languages
- Vernacular: Malayalam; Liturgical: Syriac (Aramaic)

Religion
- Christianity: Saint Thomas Christian denominations; Catholic; Syro-Malabar Church (East Syriac Rite); Syro-Malankara Church (West Syriac Rite); Oriental Orthodox (West Syriac Rite); Malankara Orthodox Syrian Church; Jacobite Syrian Christian Church; Malabar Independent Syrian Church; Assyrian Church of the East (East Syriac Rite); Chaldean Syrian Church; Oriental Protestant Christianity (Reformed-West Syriac Rite); Malankara Mar Thoma Syrian Church; St. Thomas Evangelical Church of India; Protestant; Saint Thomas Anglicans of the Church of South India (C.S.I. Rite); Pentecostal Saint Thomas Christians (riteless/nonliturgical)

Related ethnic groups
- Malayalis, Knanaya, Cochin Jews, Assyrians

The Saint Thomas Christians, also called Syrian Christians of India, Marthoma Suriyani Nasrani, Malankara Nasrani, or Nasrani Mappila, are an ethno-religious community of Indian Christians in the state of Kerala (Malabar region), who, for the most part, employ the Eastern and Western liturgical rites of Syriac Christianity. They trace their origins to the evangelistic activity of Thomas the Apostle in the 1st century. The Saint Thomas Christians had been historically a part of the hierarchy of the Church of the East but are now divided into several different Eastern Catholic, Oriental Orthodox, Protestant, and independent bodies, each with their own liturgies and traditions. They are based in Kerala and they speak Malayalam. Nasrani or Nazarene is a Syriac term for Christians, who were among the first converts to Christianity in the Near East.

Historically, this community was organised as the Province of India of the Church of the East, by Patriarch Timothy I (780–823 AD) in the eighth century, it was served by bishops and a local dynastic archdeacon. In the 14th century, the Church of the East declined in the Near East, due to persecution from Tamerlane. Portuguese colonial overtures to bring St Thomas Christians into the Latin Church of the Catholic Church, administered by their Padroado system in the 16th century, led to the first of several rifts (schisms) in the community. The attempts of the Portuguese culminated in the Synod of Diamper, formally subjugating them to the Portuguese Padroado and imposing upon them the Roman Rite of worship. The Portuguese oppression provoked a violent resistance among the Thomasine Christians, that took expression in the Coonan Cross Oath protest in 1653. This led to the permanent schism among the Thomas' Christians of India, leading to the formation of Puthankoor or Puthankūttukār ("New allegiance" ) and Paḻayakūṟ or Pazhayakūr ("Old allegiance") factions. The Paḻayakūṟ comprise the present day Syro-Malabar Church and Chaldean Syrian Church which continue to employ the original East Syriac Rite. The Puthankoottukar, who continued to resist the Catholic missionaries, organized themselves as the independent Malankara Church and entered into a new communion with the Syriac Orthodox Church of Antioch, inheriting from them the West Syriac Rite, replacing the old East Syriac Rite liturgy.

The Chaldean Syrian Church based in Thrissur represents the continuation of the traditional pre-sixteenth century church of Saint Thomas Christians in India. It forms the Indian archdiocese of the Iraq-based Assyrian Church of the East, which is one of the descendant churches of the Church of the East. They were a minority faction within the Paḻayakūṟ faction, which joined with the Church of the East Bishop during the 1870s.

The Eastern Catholic faction is in full communion with the Holy See in Rome. This includes the aforementioned Syro-Malabar Church, which follows the East Syriac Rite, as well as the West Syriac Syro-Malankara Catholic Church. The Oriental Orthodox faction includes the autocephalous Malankara Orthodox Syrian Church and Malabar Independent Syrian Church along with the Jacobite Syrian Christian Church, an integral part of the Syriac Orthodox Church headed by the Patriarch of Antioch.

Oriental Protestant denominations include the Mar Thoma Syrian Church and the St. Thomas Evangelical Church of India. Being a Reformed church influenced by Anglican missionaries in the 1800s, the Mar Thoma Church employs a Reformed variant of the liturgical West Syriac Rite. The St. Thomas Evangelical Church of India is an evangelical faction that split off from the Marthoma Church in 1961. Meanwhile, the CSI Syrian Christians represents those Malankara Syrian Christians, who joined the Anglican Church in 1836 and eventually became part of the Church of South India, a United Protestant denomination. The CSI is in full communion with the Mar Thoma Syrian Church. By the 20th century, various Syrian Christians joined Pentecostal and other evangelical denominations like the Kerala Brethren, Indian Pentecostal Church of God, Assemblies of God, among others. They are known as Pentecostal Saint Thomas Christians.

== Terminology ==
The Saint Thomas Christians have also been nicknamed such due to their reverence for Saint Thomas the Apostle, who is said to have brought Christianity to India. The name dates back to the period of Portuguese colonisation. They are also known, especially locally, as Nasrani or Nasrani Mappila. The former means Christian; it appears to have been derived from the Hebrew word Netzer or the Aramaic Nasraya from Isaiah 11:1. Nasrani is evolved from the Syriac term for "Christian" that emerges from the Greek word Nazōraioi, Nazarene in English. Mappila is an honorific applied to members of non-Indian faiths and descendants of immigrants from the Middle East who had intermarried with the local population, including Muslims (Jonaka Mappila) and Jews (Yuda Mappila). Some Syrian Christians of Travancore continue to attach this honorific title to their names. The Government of India designates members of the community as Syrian Christians, a term originating with the Dutch colonial authority that distinguishes the Saint Thomas Christians, who used Syriac (within East Syriac Rite or West Syriac Rite) as their liturgical language, from newly evangelised Christians who followed the Roman Rite. The terms Syrian or Syriac relate not to their ethnicity but to their historical, religious and liturgical connection to the Church of the East, or East Syriac Church.

== History ==
=== Origin ===
According to tradition, Thomas the Apostle came to Muziris on the Kerala coast in 52 AD which is in present-day Pattanam, near Kodungallur, Kerala. However, the visit of St. Thomas is still a matter of dispute among historians.

The Cochin Jews are known to have existed in Kerala in the 1st century AD, and it was possible for an Aramaic-speaking Jew, such as St. Thomas from Galilee, to make a trip to Kerala then. The earliest known source connecting the Apostle to Northwest India, specifically the Indo-Parthian Kingdom, is the Acts of Thomas, likely written in the early 3rd century, perhaps in Edessa.

A number of 3rd and 4th century Roman writers also mention Thomas' trip to India, including Ambrose of Milan, Gregory of Nazianzus, Jerome, and Ephrem the Syrian, while Eusebius of Caesarea records that St. Clement of Alexandria's teacher Pantaenus from Alexandria visited a Christian community in India using the Gospel of Matthew in Hebrew in the 2nd century.

The tradition of origin of the Christians in Kerala is found in a version of the Songs of Thomas or Thomma Parvam, written in 1601 and believed to be a summary of a larger and older work. Thomas is described as arriving in or around Maliankara and founding Ēḻarappaḷḷikaḷ (Seven great churches): Kodungallur, Kottakavu, Palayoor, Kokkamangalam, Nilackal, Niranam and Kollam. Some other churches, namely Thiruvithamcode Arappally (a "half church"), Malayattoor and Aruvithura are often called Arappallikal. The Thomma Parvam also narrates the conversion of Jews, natives, and the local King at Kodungallur by St Thomas. It is possible that the Jews who became Christians at that time were absorbed by what became the Nasrani Community in Kerala. The Thomma Parvam further narrates St Thomas's mission in the rest of South India and his martyrdom at Mylapore in present-day Chennai, Tamil Nadu. According to legend, the community began with Thomas's conversion of 32 Brahmin families, namely Pakalomattom, Sankarapuri, Kalli, Kaliyankal, Koikara, Madapoor, Muttodal, Kottakara, Nedumpilly, Palackal, Panakkamattom, Kunnappilly, Vazhappilly, Payyappilly, Maliakkal, Pattamukku, Thaiyil, etc.

While there is much doubt on the cultural background of early Christians, there is evidence that some members of the St Thomas Christian community observed Brahmin customs in the Middle Ages, such as the wearing of the Upanayana (sacred thread) and having a kudumi. The medieval historian Pius Malekandathil believes these were customs adopted and privileges won during the beginning of the Brahmin dominance of medieval Kerala. He argues that the Syrian Christians in Kerala, integrated with Persian Christian migrant merchants, in the 9th century to become a powerful trading community and were granted the privileges by the local rulers to promote revenue generation and to undermine Buddhist and Jain traders who rivaled the Brahmins for religious and political hegemony in Kerala at the time.

An organized Christian presence in India dates to the arrival of East Syriac settlers and missionaries from Persia, members of what would become the Church of the East, in around the 3rd century. Saint Thomas Christians trace the further growth of their community to the arrival of Jewish-Christians (early East Syriac Christians) from the region of Mesopotamia led by Knāi Thoma (anglicized as Thomas of Cana), which is said to have occurred either in the 4th or 8th century. The subgroup of the Saint Thomas Christians known as the Knanaya or Southists trace their lineage to Thomas of Cana, while the group known as the Northists claim descent from the early Christians evangelized by Thomas the Apostle. The traditional histories of the Thomas Christians note that the immigration of the Knanites reinvigorated the church of India, which was at the moment of their arrival deprived of ecclesial leadership. The arrival of the migrants is also associated with connecting the native Church of St. Thomas with the Syriac Christian tradition of the Church of the East.

During this time period Thomas of Cana received copper plates of socio-economic and religious rights for his relations, his party, and all people of his religion. The granting of these plates is noted to have enhanced the social position of all the ancient Christians of India and secured for them royal protection from the Chera dynasty. The Thomas of Cana copper plates were extant in Kerala until the 17th century after which point they were lost.

=== Classical period ===
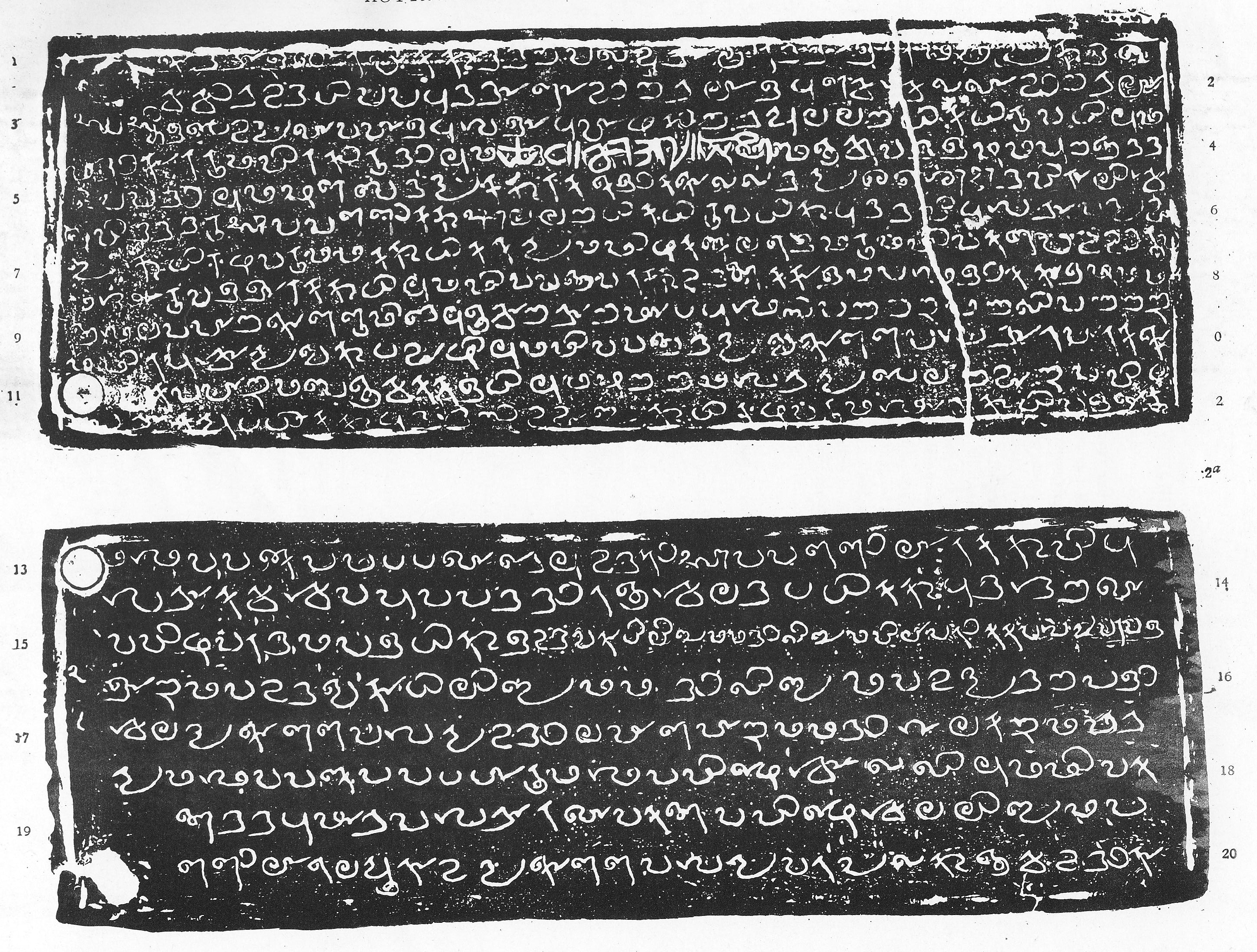
Tharisapalli Copper plate grant (9th century) – One of the reliable documentary evidences of the privileges and influence that Saint Thomas Christians enjoyed in early Malabar. The document contains signatures of the witnesses in Pahlavi, Kufic and Hebrew scripts. It is the oldest documentary evidence from India that attest the presence of a Persian Christian community in South India.

As the community grew and immigration by East Syriac Christians increased, the connection with the Church of the East, centred in the Persian capital of Seleucia-Ctesiphon, strengthened. From the early 4th century the Patriarch of the Church of the East provided India with clergy, holy texts, and ecclesiastical infrastructure, and around 650 Patriarch Ishoyahb III solidified the Church of the East's jurisdiction over the Saint Thomas Christian community. In the 8th century Patriarch Timothy I organised the community as the Ecclesiastical Province of India, one of the church's Provinces of the Exterior. After this point the Province of India was headed by a metropolitan bishop, dispatched from Persia, the "Metropolitan-Bishop of the Seat of Saint Thomas and the Whole Christian Church of India". His metropolitan see was probably in Cranganore, or (perhaps nominally) in Mylapore, where the shrine of Thomas was located. Under him were a varying number of bishops, as well as a native Archdeacon, who had authority over the clergy and who wielded a great amount of secular power.

Some contact and transmission of knowledge of the Saint Thomas Christians managed to reach the Christian West, even after the rise of the Islamic empires. Byzantine traveller Cosmas Indicopleustes wrote of Syrian Christians he met in India and Sri Lanka in the 6th century. In 883 the English king Alfred the Great reportedly sent a mission and gifts to Saint Thomas' tomb in India. During the Crusades, distorted accounts of the Saint Thomas Christians and the Nestorian Church gave rise to the European legend of Prester John.

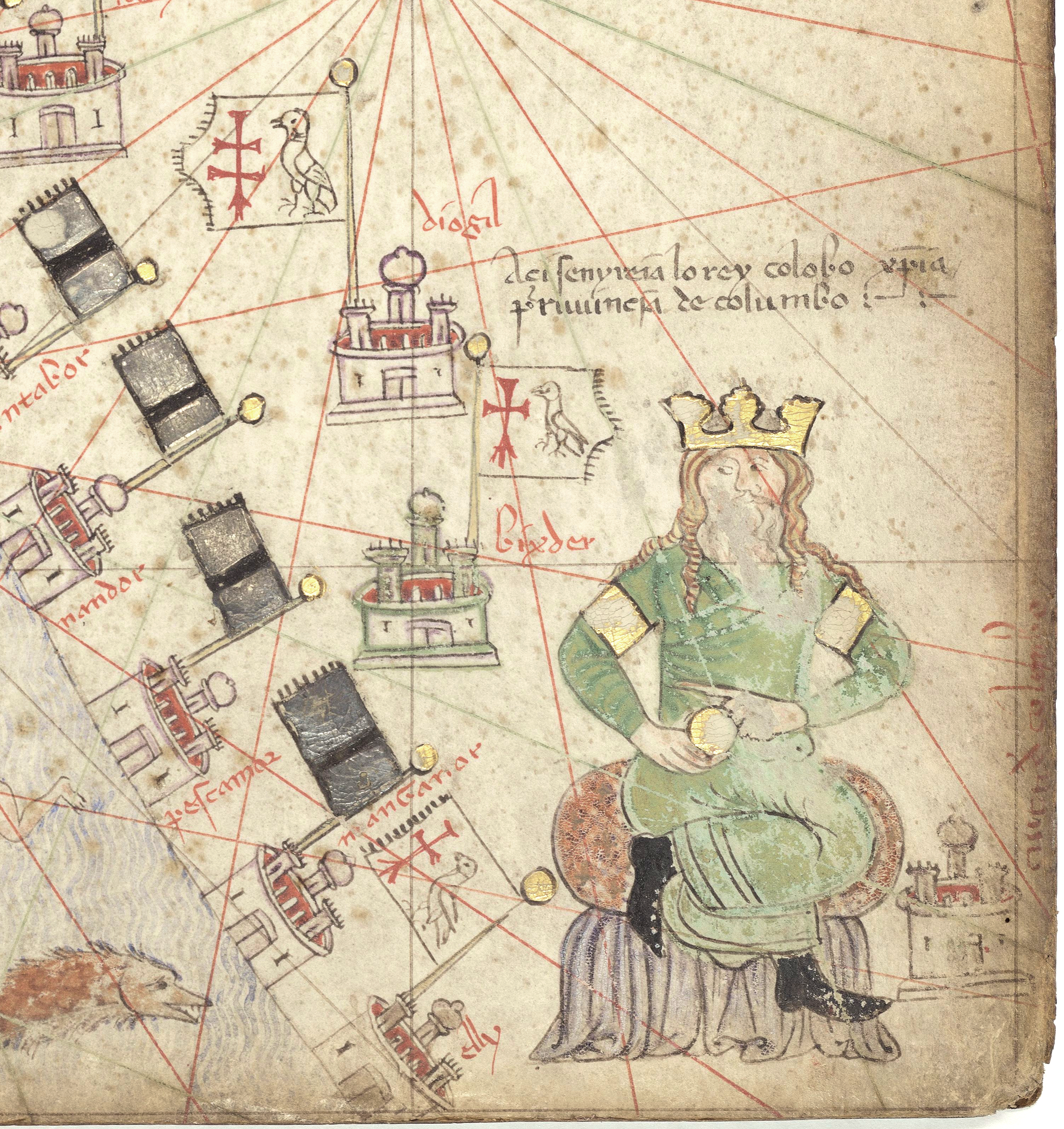
The "King of Colombo" (Kollam, flags:, identified as Christian due to the Christian presence there) in the contemporary Catalan Atlas of 1375. The caption above the king of Kollam reads: Here rules the king of Colombo, a Christian. The black flags on the coast belong to the Delhi Sultanate.

The port at Kollam, then known as Quilon, was founded in 825 by Maruvān Sapir Iso, a Persian Christian merchant, with sanction from Ayyanadikal Thiruvadikal, the king of the independent Venad or the State of Quilon, a feudatory under Sthanu Ravi Varma Perumal of the Chera kingdom. Sapir Iso is usually identified either as the East Syriac Christian merchant who led the East Syriac bishops Mar Sabor and Mar Proth to the Christians of Malabar or as the first of those two bishops. This accompanied the second Assyrian migration into the Malabar coast other than the Knanaya migration. The two bishops were instrumental in founding many Christian churches with Syrian liturgy along the Malabar coast and were venerated as Qandishangal (saints) since then by the Thomas Christians. It is believed that Sapir Iso also proposed that the Chera king create a new seaport near Kollam in lieu of his request that he rebuild the almost vanished inland seaport at Kollam (kore-ke-ni) near Backare (Thevalakara), also known as Nelcynda and Tyndis to the Romans and Greeks and as Thondi to the Tamils, which had been without trade for several centuries because the Cheras were overrun by the Pallavas in the 6th century, ending the spice trade from the Malabar coast. The Tharisapalli plates presented to Maruvan Sapor Iso by Ayyanadikal Thiruvadikal granted the Christians the privilege of overseeing foreign trade in the city as well as control over its weights and measures in a move designed to increase Quilon's trade and wealth.

Thus began the Malayalam Era, known as Kollavarsham after the city, indicating the importance of Kollam in the 9th century.

Church of the East and its dioceses and missions throughout Asia, including India

The great distances involved and the geopolitical turmoil of the period caused India to be cut off from the church's heartland in Mesopotamia at several points. In the 11th century the province was suppressed by the church entirely, as it had become impossible to reach, but effective relations were restored by 1301. However, following the collapse of the Church of the East's hierarchy in most of Asia later in the 14th century, India was effectively cut off from the church, and formal contact was severed. By the late 15th century India had had no metropolitan for several generations, and the authority traditionally associated with him had been vested in the archdeacon.

MS Vatican Syriac 22 is the oldest known Syriac manuscript copied in India. It is a lectionary of Pauline Epistles copied in 1301 AD (1612 AG) in Kodungallūr (Cranganore, Classical Syriac: ܫܸܢܓܲܲܠܐ, romanized: Shengala) at the Church dedicated to Mar Quriaqos.

MS Vatican Syriac 22 has the following passage about the "Catholicos-Patriarch of the East" and the "Metropolitan of India" in folio 93r- 94v:

This holy book has been copied in the royal, renowned and famous town Shengala, which is in Malabar in the land of India, in the holy Church dedicated to the Mar Quriaqos, the glorious martyr... whilst our blessed and holy father Mar Yahballaha the fifth, the Turk, qatoliqa Patriakis of the East, the head of all the countries, was great governor, holding the offices of the Catholic Church of East, the shining lamp which illuminates its regions, the head of the pastors and Pontiff of the pontiffs, Head of great high priests, Father of the fathers... The Lord may make long his life and protect his days in order that he may govern her, a long time, for her glory and for the exaltation of her sons. Amen...

And when Mar Jacob, Metropolitan Bishop was the overseer and governor of the holy see of Saint Thomas the Apostle, that is to say governor of us and of all the holy Church of the Christian India. May God grant him strength and help that he may govern us with zeal and direct us according to the will of his Lord, and that he may teach us His commandments and make us walk in His ways, till the end of time, through the intercession of the holy Apostle St. Thomas and all his colleagues ! Amen!..

— MS Vatican Syriac 22

This manuscript is written in Estrangela script by a very young deacon named Zakharya bar Joseph bar Zakharya who was just 14 at the time of writing. The scribe refers Catholicos-Patriarch of the East Yahballaha III as Yahaballaha the fifth. Johannes P. M. van der Ploeg comments that this may indicate that the patriarch was not well known among the Indian Christians.

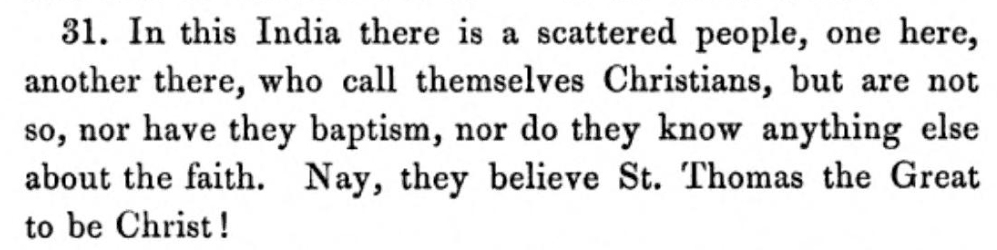
Catholic critical account of Saint-Thomas Christians in India, written by traveller and missionary Jordanus in 1329–1338 in Mirabilia Descripta

In 1490, a delegation from the Saint Thomas Christians visited the Patriarch of the East, Shemon IV, to bring a bishop for India. One among them was Joseph the Indian, who later became famous for his visit to Rome and the account of Malabar in Book VI of Paesi novamente retrovati (1507) by Fracanzano da Montalboddo. The patriarch responded positively to the request of Saint Thomas Christians, and appointed two bishops, Mar Thoma and Mar Yohannan, dispatching them to India. These bishops, and three more (Mar Yahballaha, Mar Dinkha and Mar Yaqov) who followed them in 1503–1504, reaffirmed and strengthened traditional ties between India and the Patriarchate. They were later followed by another bishop, Mar Abraham, who died in 1597. By that time, Christians of the Malabar Coast were facing new challenges, caused by the establishment of Portuguese presence in India.

=== Portuguese contact ===
The Saint Thomas Christians first encountered the Portuguese in 1498, during the expedition of Vasco da Gama. At the time the community was in a tenuous position: though thriving in the spice trade and protected by their own militia, the local political sphere was volatile and the Saint Thomas Christians found themselves under pressure from the rajas of Calicut and Cochin and other small kingdoms in the area. The Saint Thomas Christians and the Portuguese newcomers quickly formed an alliance.

The Portuguese had a keen interest in implanting themselves in the spice trade and in spreading their version of Christianity, which had been forged during several centuries of warfare in the Reconquista. Facilitating their goals was the Padroado Real, a series of treaties and decrees in which the Pope conferred upon the Portuguese government certain authority in ecclesiastical matters in the foreign territories they conquered. They set up in Goa, forming a colonial government and a Latin church hierarchy under the Archbishop of Goa, and quickly set to bringing the Saint Thomas Christians under his authority.

The Portuguese subjection of the Saint Thomas Christians was relatively measured at first, but they became more aggressive after 1552, the year of the death of Metropolitan Mar Jacob and of a schism in the Church of the East, which resulted in there being two rival Patriarchs—one of whom entered communion with the Catholic Church. Both patriarchs sent bishops to India, but the Portuguese consistently managed to outmaneuver them, and effectively cut off the Saint Thomas Christians from their hierarchy in 1575, when the Padroado legislated that neither patriarch could send representatives to India without Portuguese approval.

By 1599 the last Metropolitan, Abraham, had died, and the Archbishop of Goa, Aleixo de Menezes, had secured the submission of the young Archdeacon Givargis, the highest remaining representative of the native church hierarchy. The Archbishop convened the Synod of Diamper, which implemented various liturgical and structural reforms in the Indian church. The Synod brought the parishes directly under the Archbishop's purview; anathematised certain "superstitious" social customs characteristic of their Hindu neighbors, including untouchability and a caste hierarchy; and purged the liturgy, the East Syriac Rite, of elements deemed unacceptable according to the Latin protocol. A number of Syriac texts were condemned and ordered burnt, including the Peshitta, the Syriac version of the Bible. Some of the reforms, especially the elimination of caste status, reduced the Saint Thomas Christians' standing with their socially stratified Hindu neighbors. The Synod formally brought the Saint Thomas Christians into the Catholic Church but the actions of the Portuguese over the ensuing years fueled resentment in segments of the community, and ultimately led to open resistance to their power.

=== Division and defiance ===
Over the next several decades, tensions seethed between the Portuguese and the remaining native hierarchy, and after 1641 Archdeacon Thomas, the nephew and successor to Archdeacon George of Cross, was often at odds with the Latin prelates. In 1652, the escalating situation was further complicated by the appearance in Mylapore of a mysterious figure named Ahatallah, who claimed to have been sent by the Pope, from the Church of Antioch to serve as "Patriarch of the Whole of India and of China".

Ahatallah made a strong impression on the native clergy, but the Portuguese quickly decided he was an impostor, and put him on a ship bound for Europe by way of Goa. Archdeacon Thomas, desperate for a new ecclesiastical leader to free his people from the Padroado, travelled to Cochin and demanded to meet Ahatallah and examine his credentials. The Portuguese refused, stating the ship had already left for Goa. Ahatallah was never heard from in India again, inspiring false rumours that the Portuguese had murdered him and inflaming anti-Portuguese sentiments even more.

This was the last straw for the Saint Thomas Christians; in 1653, Thomas and community representatives met at the Church of Our Lady in Mattancherry to take bold action. In a great ceremony before a crucifix and lighted candles, they swore a solemn oath that they would never obey Padroado Archbishop Francisco Garcia or the Portuguese again, and that they accepted only the Archdeacon as their shepherd. There are various versions about the wording of oath, one version being that the oath was directed against the Portuguese, another that it was directed against Jesuits, yet another version that it was directed against the authority of Catholic Latin Church. The independent Malankara Church regards the Coonan Cross Oath as the moment their Church regained its independence from the Catholic Church, which they lost during the Synod of Diamper.

After the events of Coonan Cross Oath three letters were circulated claiming that they had been sent by Ahathalla. One such letter was read at a meeting at Edappally on 5 February 1653. This letter granted to the archdeacon some powers of the archbishop. On hearing it, a vast crowd enthusiastically welcomed Archdeacon Thomas as the governor of their Church and four senior priests were appointed as his counsilors, namely, Anjilimoottil Itty Thommen of Kallisseri, Kuravilangad Parambil Palliveettil Chandy, Kaduthuruthi Kadavil Chandy, Angamali Vengur Giwargis Kathanar. At a further meeting held at Alangat, on 23 May 1653, another letter was read stating that it was from Ahathalla. It instructed the Saint Thomas Christians in the absence of a bishop, twelve of the cattanars (priests) might lay their hands on Thomas, and that this would be adequate as episcopal consecration. The authenticity of these letters is not clear. Some are of the opinion that these letters might be forged by Anjilimoottil Itty Thommen Kathanar who was a skilled Syriac writer. The letters were read with enthusiasm in the churches of the Thomas Christians and Archdeacon Thomas was later proclaimed bishop in a ceremony in which twelve priests laid hands on him, elevating him as Metropolitan with the title Thoma I and he added such ancient titles as 'Metran of All India', 'Gate of India'.

At this point, the Portuguese missionaries attempted reconciliation with Saint Thomas Christians but were not successful. Later, in 1657, Pope Alexander VII sent the Italian priest Joseph Sebastiani as the head of a Carmelite mission of the Propaganda Fide to regain the trust of the dissident St. Thomas Christians. Sebastiani and other Carmelites pressed that the ordination of the archdeacon as metropolitan by the priests in the absence of another bishop was not in accordance with Church laws. They succeeded in convincing a large group of Saint Thomas Christians, including Kadavil Chandy, Palliveettil Chandy and Vengur Giwargis, and Thoma I began to lose his followers. In the meantime, Sebastiani returned to Rome and was consecrated as bishop on 15 December 1659. He reached Kerala again in 1661, being appointed as the Vicar Apostolic of Malabar by the pope. Within a short time period he restored majority of the churches that had been with Thoma I to Catholic Church. However, in 1663, with the conquest of Cochin by the Dutch, the control of the Portuguese on the Malabar coast was lost. The Dutch declared that all the European missionaries had to leave Kerala. Before leaving Kerala, on 1 February 1663, Sebastiani consecrated Palliveettil Chandy was consecrated as the bishop of the Thomas Christians who adhered to Catholic Church. He soon also designated himself as 'Metran of All India' and 'Gate of India'.

A diagram showing the history of the divisions among the Saint Thomas Christians

Thoma I, meanwhile sent requests to various Oriental Churches to receive canonical consecration as bishop. In 1665, Gregorios Abdal Jaleel, a bishop sent by the Syrian Orthodox Patriarch of Antioch Ignatius ʿAbdulmasīḥ I, arrived in India and the faction under the leadership of Thoma I welcomed him. The bishop was sent in correspondence to the letter sent by Thoma I to the Oriental Orthodox Patriarchate of Antioch. Bishop Abdul Jaleel consecrated Thoma I canonically as a bishop and regularised his episcopal succession. This led to the first lasting formal schism in the Saint Thomas Christian community. Thereafter, the faction affiliated with the Catholic Church under Bishop Palliveettil Chandy came to be known as Paḻayakūṟ (or "Old Allegiance"), and the branch affiliated with Thoma I came to be known as Puthenkur (or "New Allegiance"). These appellations have been somewhat controversial, though, as both parties considered themselves the true heirs to the Saint Thomas tradition, and saw the other party as schismatic. The Paḻayakūṟ faction was also known as Romo-Syrians and organized as the Syrian Catholic Church whereas the Puthenkur faction was also known as Jacobite Syrians and organized as the Malankara Syrian Church.

Between 1661 and 1665, the Paḻayakūṟ faction (Syrian Catholics) claimed 72 of the 116 churches, while Archdeacon Thoma I and the Puthenkur faction (Malankara Syrians) claimed 32. The remaining 12 churches were shared between the two factions until the late nineteenth century. The Paḻayakūṟ faction is the body from which the modern Syro-Malabar Church and Chaldean Syrian Church descend. The Puthenkur faction is the body from which the Jacobite, Orthodox, CSI Syrian Christians, Marthoma, St. Thomas Evangelical Church of India, Syro-Malankara Catholic Church and Malabar Independent Syrian Church originate.

This visit of Gregorios Abdal Jaleel gradually introduced the West Syriac liturgy, customs and script to the Malabar Coast. The visits of prelates from the Syriac Orthodox Church of Antioch continued since then and this led to gradual replacement of the East Syriac Rite liturgy with the West Syriac Rite and the Malankara Church affiliated to the Miaphysite Christology of the Oriental Orthodox Communion. Furthermore, ʿAbdulmasīḥ I sent Maphrian Baselios Yaldo in 1685, along with Bishop Ivanios Hidayattullah who vehemently propagated the West Syriac Rite and solidified the association of the Malankara Church with the Syriac Orthodox Church.

The main body of the Paḻayakūṟ faction (Syrian Catholics) came to be known as the Syro-Malabar Church. They continued with their East Syriac traditions and stayed within the Catholic Church with Diophysite creed. They had to remain under the foreign Latin bishops, with the only exception of Palliveettil Chandy and Kariattil Ousep. Their Indian East Syriac Catholic hierarchy was restored on 21 December 1923, with Augustine Kandathil as the first Metropolitan and head.

=== Failed attempts for reunification and solidification of the schism ===
A minority within the community of Saint Thomas Christians tried to preserve the use of the East Syriac Rite and re-establishing ties with Patriarchs of the Church of the East, who occasionally sent envoys to India. At the beginning of the 18th century, Bishop Shemʿon of ʿAda (d. c. 1720) and in (c. 1708), Bishop Gabriel of Ardishai (d. c. 1733) arrived to India, sent by the Chaldean Patriarch. Bishop Gabriel temporarily succeeded in reviving the traditionalist community, but was faced with prolonged rivalry, both from West Syriac (Jacobite) and Latin Catholic (Propaganda Fide and Padroado) leadership.

In 1751, Jacobite Maphrian Baselios Shakrallah Qasabgi came to Kerala. He was highly instrumental in replacing the East Syriac Rite with West Syriac Rite among the Puthenkur faction. He was accompanied by Gregorios Hanna Bakhudaidi, the Jacobite Archbishop of Jerusalem, and Yukhannon (Ivanios) Christophoros of Mosul, whom the Maphrian consecrated as a bishop during his tenure in Kerala. The delegation was sent from the Syriac Orthodox Patriarchate to firmly establish West Syriac Rite among the Puthenkur and regularise the orders of their leader, Thoma V. However, Thoma V died without having reconsecrated, but having himself consecrated his successor as Thoma VI. Thoma VI strongly resisted the efforts of the delegation. Very often the Syriac Orthodox delegates selected their own candidates and ordained them as priests, without consulting Thoma VI. Meanwhile, the Paḻayakūṟ were being increasingly subjugated by their colonial Latin ecclesiastical administrators.

Thoma VI, therefore, initiated efforts to reunify both the factions. However, the Carmelite missionaries working among the Paḻayakūṟ were reluctant to reciprocate to his efforts fearing that the indigenous bishop would take away their authority and influence over the faction after the proposed reunification of the Saint Thomas Christians was fulfilled. On the other hand, the Syriac Orthodox delegates were extending their influence upon the Puthenkur, insisting the faction to shift to the West Syriac Rite. Shakrallah, immediately prior to his death, consecrated Kurian Kattumangat as Bishop Abraham Koorilose in 1764.

By 1770, Gregorios and Ivanios had Thoma VI reconsecrated as 'Dionysios I'. Thoma VI had to receive all orders of priesthood from the tonsure to the episcopal consecration. Thoma VI received support from Paḻayakūṟ leaders, who informed him of the ill-treatment and discrimination that they faced from the missionaries. Consequently, two priestly leaders among them: Kariattil Iousep Malpan and Paremmakkal Thoma Kathanar decided to meet the Pope to convey the message of Thoma VI. The Jacobite delegates were soon at odds with Thoma VI and hence in 1772 they raised Abraham Koorilose to the Metropolitan rank at the new Mattancherry Church in Cochin, constructed by Shakrallah. Abraham Koorilose received recognition from the Rajah of Cochin. Kariyattil Iousep, accompanied by Paremmakkal Thoma and two other deacons, made the trip from Kerala in 1778 and he was consecrated as the Archbishop of Cranganore in 1782. However, the efforts drastically failed because of the unexpected death of Iousep while in Goa. Varthamanappusthakam, written by Thoma Kathanar in 1785, provides the detail of this journey until the death of the archbishop.

Following this, in 1787, representatives from eighty-four Paḻayakūṟ churches assembled at Angamaly and drew up the Angamāly Padiyōla against the colonial Latin hegemony, declaring their allegiance to the Paremmakkal Thoma and urged for the reinstatement of their native East Syriac hierarchy. Meanwhile, Dionysios I (Thoma VI) managed to imprison his rival, Abraham Koorilose who finally escaped from the states of Travancore and Cochin where the majority of Saint Thomas Christians lived to Anjoor in the territory of the Samuthiri (Zamorin of Calicut). There Koorilose spent his days in prayer and meditation in a hut. A few relatives and friends joined him there. This group, originally known as the Thozhiyur Church, was later confirmed as an independent Syrian Church in Malabar by the Madras High Court, through a verdict in 1862. Subsequently, they took the name Malabar Independent Syrian Church.

=== British period ===
In 1795, the kings of Travancore and Cochin entered into tributary alliance with the British East Indian Company to repel the attacks from Tipu Sultan. The states soon became client regimes of the company: both were forced to disband their military. The political order of the states also began to collapse. Saint Thomas Christians were hit hard by the loss of their privileged military role, their kalari network was dissolved and many families lost their livelihood. The trading class, as well as the office bearers, also suffered the setback and many Europeans who visited the states between 1801 and 1820 noted the poor and depressed condition of Saint Thomas Christians of the Puthenkur. Some partisan fund allocation for the churches by the British officials triggered a breakdown in the relationship between Saint Thomas Christians and prominent Hindu castes, at least temporarily. In 1815, the British Resident, Colonel John Munro, founded a seminary in Kottayam, for the theological education of Jacobite Christian priests and invited the Anglican missionaries to teach there. This could be regarded as the beginning of the relationship between the CMS (Church Mission Society) and the Saint Thomas Christians of the Puthenkur.

==== Further divisions ====
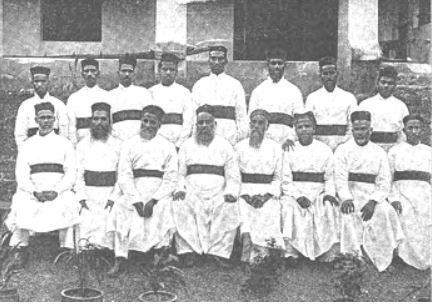
Original Syrian–Anglican cattanars from the nineteenth century

As a protest against the interference of the Anglican Church in the affairs of the Puthenkur faction of the Saint Thomas Christians, the Metropolitan, Cheppad Dionysios, convened a Synod at Mavelikara on 16 January 1836. There it was declared that Malankara Church would be subject to the Syrian traditions and Patriarch of Antioch. The declaration resulted in the separation of the CMS missionaries from the communion with the Malankara Church. Cheppad Dionysios, abdicated during the tenure of an Antiochian prelate named Yuyakim Koorilose (arrived c. 1846, d. c. 1874). During his stay in among the Puthenkur, Koorilose completed the transition to West Syriac ritual practices. However, a minority from the Malankara Church, who were in favour of the Reformed ideologies of the missionaries, stood along with them and joined the Anglican Church. These Saint Thomas Anglicans, were the first Reformed group to emerge from the Saint Thomas Christian community and they worked along with the missionaries in their evangelical, educational and reformative activities. By 1879, the Diocese of Travancore and Cochin of the Church of England was established in Kottayam. On 27 September 1947, the Anglican dioceses in South India, merged with other Protestant churches in the region and formed the Church of South India (CSI); an independent United Church in full communion with all its predecessor denominations. Since then, Anglican Syrian Christians have been members of the Church of South India and also came to be known as CSI Syrian Christians.

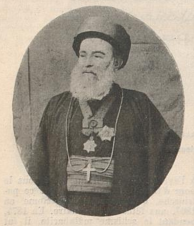
Mar Elias Mellus

In 1860, tired of their Latin subjugation, the Paḻayakūṟ sent a delegation headed by Antony Thondanatt (d. c. 1900) to Mosul to make a plea to the Chaldean Catholic patriarch to consecrate a bishop of their own rite for them. In response, Patriarch Joseph VI Audo consecrated Thomas Rokos, titular archbishop of Basra, and dispatched him to visit the alienated Malabar Christian flock in 1861. However, the mission failed due to the protests of the apostolic delegate at Mosul, Henri Amanton, and the vicar apostolic of Verapoly. As a result, the Pope forced the Patriarch to call back the bishop. There was yet another incident on 5 June 1864. Patriarch Joseph VI consecrated Elias Mellus, bishop of ʿAqra, and sent him to India. But this effort too was met with the same fate as before and Mellus was called back in 1882. Meanwhile, in 1862, an attempt was made to reestablish direct ties between traditionalist Christian communities in India and the Assyrian Patriarch Shimun XVIII consecrated the aforementioned Thondanatt as Abdisho, the Metropolitan of India, but his task proved to be very difficult and challenging. He intensified his activity after 1882, fulfilling the aspirations of local Christians of the East Syriac Rite for the full re-establishment of traditional ecclesiastical structure. Until his death in 1900, he partially succeeded in organizing the local church, that was named the Chaldean Syrian Church. After his death, local Christians appealed to Shimun XIX, Patriarch of the Assyrian Church of the East in Qochanis who was forthcoming, and in December 1907 consecrated Abimalek Timotheus as metropolitan bishop for India. He reached his diocese in February 1908, and took over the administration. He organized ecclesiastical structures, and continued with revitalisation of the East Syriac Rite.

By June 1875, there were two factions among the Malankara Church: Conservative Party and Reform Party. Mathews Athanasius was the Malankara Metropolitan approved by the Governments of Travancore and of Cochin and he was supportive to the reforming of the Jacobite church with evangelistic ideologies. Hence the group with Mathews Athanasius was known as "Reform Party" The conservative faction, under the leadership of Metropolitan Pulikkottil Joseph Dionysious II, opposed the attempts to do away with the age-old traditions of the church, which resulted in a stir in the community. Being invited by this faction, the Antiochene Patriarch Ignatius Peter III arrived in Kerala. In June 1876, at the synod of Mulanthuruthy, presided over by the Patriarch, the Syrian faction formally came under the Antiochene Patriarchate. The synod condemned Mathews Athanasius for abstaining from it, but his followers stayed firm with him. His successor Thomas Athanasius and the bishop's faction lost the lawsuit to the Patriarchal faction in the Royal Court of Travancore on 12 July 1889. Nonetheless, the Reform Party continued as an independent Church and thereafter a series of suits arose on the rights over churches and associated properties. Later they chose the name Mar Thoma Syrian Church.

In 1911, Patriarch Ignatius ʿAbdullāh II excommunicated Vattasseril Geevarghese Dionysios (Dionysios VI), the Malankara Metropolitan, due to dispute of authority over the properties of the Malankara Church. This led to the division of the Church into two groups, with one group accepting the supreme authority of the patriarch and the other supporting Dionysios VI. The group led by Dionysios VI invited Patriarch Ignatius ʿAbdulmasīḥ II, who was deposed from Patriarchate by the Turkish authorities. In 1912, ʿAbdulmasīḥ II arrived in India and he consecrated Baselios Paulose I (d. c. 1914) as Maphrian (Syriac Orthodox Catholicos). This was not recognised by the Syriac Orthodox Church. Previously ʿAbdulmasīḥ II himself had declined the request for the installation of a Maphrianate for India in 1902 during his patriarchate. The independent group under Metropolitan Dionysios VI, known as the 'Metropolitan's Party', started endorsing the claims for autocephaly. The other group, known as the 'Patriarch's Party', remained loyal to the Patriarch and was led by Coorilos Paulose, succeeded by Athanasius Paulose. The two sides filed a series of lawsuits in the civil courts and some parallel attempts to reconcile both the parties also took place. In 1958, bishops of both the parties sealed their reconciliation and signed a treaty which in turn recognised the autonomy of reunited factions, with its own synod of bishops under the presidency of the Catholicos. The verdict of the Supreme Court of India in 1958, legitimizing the autonomy of Kerala church, was instrumental in this formal reconciliation between the two sides. In 1964, Patriarch Ignatius Yaʿqub III consecrated Baselios Augen I (d. c. 1975) as the Catholicos. Nonetheless, in 1975, both the parties split again with the decision of the Universal Syrian Synod, held in Damascus, to depose the Catholicos in Kerala and Baselios Paulose II was consecrated as the Catholicos for the 'Patriarch faction'. Today the West Syriac Oriental Orthodox community in India is divided between the Malankara Orthodox Syrian Church (an autocephalous Oriental Orthodox church) and the Jacobite Syrian Christian Church (an autonomous church under the Antiochene Patriarchate).

In 1930, a section of the Malankara Church under the leadership of Archbishop Geevarghese Ivanios and Jacob Theophilos left the Malankara Orthodox Syrian Church and came into communion with the Catholic Church. They are known as Syro-Malankara Catholic Church. On 11 June 1932, Trivandrum was recognised as a Metropolitan See sui juris, with Thiruvalla as its suffragan. On 10 February 2005, the church was raised to the status of a Major archiepiscopal church. The canonical installation of Cyril Baselios as the first Major Archbishop took place on 14 May 2005 and simultaneously the title 'Catholicos' was legitimized. The St. Ephrem Ecumenical Research Institute (SEERI), inaugurated on 14 September 1985, comes under the Syro-Malankara Catholic Archbishop of Thiruvalla.

In 1961, there was a split in the Malankara Mar Thoma Syrian Church which resulted in the formation of St. Thomas Evangelical Church of India.

Pentecostalism began to spread among Saint Thomas Christians from 1911, due to American missionary work. The first Syrian Pentecostals came from Kerala Brethren, who were in turn mostly ex-Marthomites. As the movement gained momentum, groups of people from all traditional St. Thomas Christian denominations became part of various emerging Pentecostal and evangelical fellowships. Pentecostals from Syrian Christian background spearheaded the movement in Kerala and to a lesser extent in India, by providing the necessary leadership for establishing denominations like Indian Pentecostal Church of God, Assemblies of God in India, Church of God (Full Gospel) in India, The Pentecostal Mission and many other Neo-charismatic churches. The Syro-Malabar Church too has a very active Charismatic ministry, operated through establishments such as the Divine Retreat Centre, Muringoor.

==== Involvement in politics ====
Participation based on caste and community divisions and sympathies has been a feature of politics in the present day state of Kerala and its predecessor entities. Until the mid-20th century the primary cause of the divisions between the various communities was competition for rights and resources.

Like other communities, Saint Thomas Christians have been involved in regional politics on a community basis. In 1888, Travancore became the first princely state in India to establish a Legislative Council, which was reformed as the Sree Moolam Popular Assembly in 1904. A few Saint Thomas Christian leaders were elected to the Legislative Council but there was resentment that their share of the available seats was proportionately less than that of other prominent castes. This resentment led to a series of campaigns for equal representation both in the legislature and in government positions. Jatiaikya Sangham, an organization formed with an objective of reuniting the Paḻayakūṟ and Puthenkur communities, came up with the idea of a newspaper that resulted in the establishment of Nasrani Deepika by Nidhirikkal Manikkathanar in 1887. Newspapers such as the Nasrani Deepika and Malayala Manorama disseminated their grievances.

In 1918, Saint Thomas Christians formed the League for Equal Civic Rights, which sought the opening of all branches of government service to Christians, Muslims and avarna Hindus, as well as an end to the practice of untouchability. Their demands were partially met in 1922 when the Revenue Department was separated from the Devaswom, a semi-government organization that managed the Hindu temples, thus removing the restriction on non-Hindus and avarnas in the executive service. In the 1920s, Saint Thomas Christian leaders such as George Joseph were advised by Mahatma Gandhi to detach from Vaikom Satyagraha, an agitation for the temple entry rights of avarna Hindus, as he considered the issue to be one of concern to Hindus alone. Titus Theverthundiyil was one of the 78 marchers selected by Gandhi to take part in the 1930 Dandi March, to break the British salt monopoly.

With the institution in 1932 of a bicameral legislature in Travancore, four Saint Thomas Christians found a place in among the 24 seats of the lower house, but not comparable with other forward castes. The 1931 census recorded over 31 per cent of the population as being Christian, compared to around 4 per cent in 1820. Some restrictions were imposed on Saint Thomas Christian parishes to start new schools and later on the Diwan attempted to take over the schools owned by the community. There followed a period of fierce confrontation between the Diwan and Saint Thomas Christians—many leaders were arrested, prominent news papers were banned and large banks owned by the community members were liquidated. In 1937, general elections were held and Joint Political Congress played a significant role to attain much better representation for allied communities. T.M. Varghese was elected as the Deputy President of the Assembly where C. P. Ramaswami Iyer was the ex officio President. On the collapse of Joint Political Congress due to internal conflicts, Saint Thomas Christian leaders allied with Nairs in a common platform- Travancore State Congress where they fought together for responsible government and also to oust Iyer. Abraham Marthoma mobilised Syrian Christians against the divan's move not to unite with free India. In the three-member Cabinet of Travancore formed after the first general elections in 1948, Varghese was a Cabinet Minister. However the first Saint Thomas Christian to become a minister in the central government of India was Padma Vibhushan John Mathai, who served as India's first Railway Minister and subsequently as India's Finance Minister, taking office shortly after the presentation of India's first Budget, in 1948.

On 1 November 1956, the state of Kerala was formed and the Communist Party of India formed the first government of the state in 1957 on winning the assembly elections. Though the government initiated the legislation process for reforming the land and the education sectors, these were considered as infringements over the rights by the school managements and landowners, who were predominantly Saint Thomas Christians and Nairs. The disagreements of the Saint Thomas Christians further widened and they allied with Nair Service Society to mobilize against the government, which culminated in a violent struggle, called the Liberation Struggle, in 1958. The Communist government was dismissed on 31 July 1959 and the President's rule was imposed in the state under Article 356 of the Constitution of India.

== Population ==
Writing in 2010, Devika and Varghese noted that "[The St. Thomas Christians] are at present a substantial minority, a powerful presence in all fields of life in Kerala."

=== Demographics ===
The Saint Thomas Syrian Christians form 12.5 percent of the total population of Kerala and 70.73 percent of the Christians in the state. K. C. Zachariah notes that the 20th century was period of significant transition for the Saint Thomas Christians in terms of its demographic and socioeconomic status. Around 1900, the community was concentrated in a few areas, was geographically static and "... was characterised by very high death rate, very high birth rate, very early age at marriage, and 10 to 12 children per married woman". The population had increased eight-fold during the preceding century, from a base figure of about 100,000, and comprised nearly 50 per cent children. But, the population growth of Saint Thomas Christians came down drastically after the 1960s, with the lowest birth rate, highest age at marriage, highest family planning user rate, and lowest fertility rate compared to other communities in Kerala. The proportion of children has come down to less than 25 percent. The absolute and relative size of the community is in a diminishing trend and is approaching a zero population growth regime.

As of 2001, in Kerala, more than 85 per cent of the Saint Thomas Christian population live in the seven southern districts of the state—Kollam, Pathanamthitta, Alappuzha, Kottayam, Idukki, Ernakulam and Trissur. They have also migrated to other cities in India like Ooty, Mangalore, Bangalore, Chennai, Pune, Delhi, Mumbai, Coimbatore, Hyderabad and Kolkata. Migration steeply increased in the post-independence period and major destinations were United States of America, Canada, Western Europe, Australia and the Middle East. According to a rough estimate, 20–25 percent of the Saint Thomas Christians live outside the state of Kerala.

With respect to Christian denomination, 55% of Saint Thomas Christians in the Indian state of Kerala belong to the Catholic Church. In 1980, the Mar Thoma Syrian Church (Reformed) had a church membership of around 400,000 communicants, while the Syriac Orthodox Church (Oriental Orthodox) had 1,400,000 members.

=== Ethnic divisions ===
Internally the Saint Thomas Christian community is divided into two ethnic groups, the majority and older group known as Vadakkumbhagar or Northist and the minority and younger group as Tekkumbhagar or Southist also known as Knanaya.

One tradition traces the origin of these ethno-geographical epithets to the city of Kodungallur, the historic capital of the medieval Chera dynasty. The early converts of Saint Thomas the Apostle and those who later joined the faith in India are believed to have initially resided on the northern side of the city of Kodungallur and for that reason became known as Vadakkumbhagar or Northist.

In either the 4th or 8th century, the Syriac Christian merchant magnate Knai Thoma is believed to have arrived and settled in southern Kodungallur with a cohort of merchants and clergymen. Because they dwelled on the southern side, the descendants of Thoma's migration became known as Tekkumbhagar or Southist. Since the nineteenth century, the Southist community is also known by the appellation K'nā'nāya (Syriac for Canaanite), an adjectival epithet coined from the name Knai Thoma.

=== Socioeconomic status ===
Even though the Saint Thomas Christians had to compromise their social and religious privileges in the aftermath of Portuguese subjugation, they started reemerging as a powerful community from the 19th century onward. They played a pioneering role in many spheres such as banking, commerce, cash crops, print media, the film industry, etc. Around 2003, among Saint Thomas Christians, 17.4 percent of the adult population are self-employed—the highest rate statistically among all the communities in the state of Kerala. Saint Thomas Christians lead all others with respect to per capita ownership of land, with many of them owning large estates. With changing conditions, they have shifted from the agriculture of rice and coconut to plantation based agriculture and the trading of rubber, spices and cash crops. They also take a prominent role in the educational institutions of Kerala and throughout India. The educational accomplishments of the community have helped its members to attain a good proportion of the Central and State Government jobs. Kerala Government in the year 2024 happened to present the community wise account of the government employees in its Legislative Assembly. According to the data, out of the then total 5,45,423 government employees in the state, 73,713 are from forward Christian communities, ie., Saint Thomas Christians, which accounts for the 13.5 percent of the total government employees. With their level of education and limited employment opportunities within the state of Kerala, they became the community with the highest rate of migration. Their resultant foreign remittances have also helped the socioeconomic progress of the community. According to the Kerala Migration Survey (1998) by the Center for Developmental Studies, Kerala, Saint Thomas Christians top all other communities in Kerala with respect to the Socioeconomic Development Index which is based on parameters such as the possession of land, housing & consumer durables, education and employment status.

=== Syrian Christian caste status ===
Despite the sectarian differences, Saint Thomas Syrian Christians share a common social status within the Caste system of Kerala and is considered as an Upper caste community.

In historic kingdoms of Kerala such as those of Cochin and Travancore, Saint Thomas Christians were granted caste privileges that put them on the same level as Upper caste Hindus. Anthropologist, L.K. Ananthakrishna Iyer recorded that they were given privileges in addition to those granted to groups such as Nairs, such as the right to have enclosures in front of their houses, which was otherwise only granted to the Brahmins, and were placed "almost on par with the Sovereigns". They followed the same rules of caste and pollution as did Hindus, and sometimes they were considered to be pollution neutralisers. Decree II of Action IX of the Synod of Diamper enforced by the Portuguese Inquisition in 1599 prohibited the practice of untouchability by the Saint Thomas Christians except in practical circumstances when required by law and when it was necessary to ensure social contact with the Varna Hindus.

They tend to be endogamous, and tend not to intermarry even with other Christian groupings. Internal division of Saint Thomas Christians into Northists and Southists and also into a number of sects based on the ecclesiastical orientation makes the pattern of segmentation an exceedingly complex. Forrester suggests that the Northist-Southist division forms two groups within the Saint Thomas Christian community which are closely analogous to sub-castes.

== Socio-cultural and religious identity ==
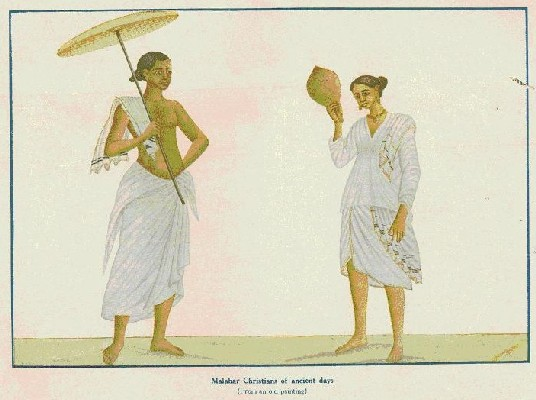
Nasranis or Syrian Christians of Kerala in ancient days (from an old painting). Photo published in the Cochin Government Royal War Efforts Souvenir in 1938.

Saint Thomas Christians are a distinct community in terms of culture and religion. Though their liturgy and theology remained that of East Syrian Christians of Persia, their lifestyle customs and traditions were basically Indian. It is oft-quoted: "Nazranis are Indian in culture, Christian in faith and Syrian in liturgy".

At present, Saint Thomas Christians represent a multi-cultural group. Their culture is largely derived from East Syriac, West Syriac, Jewish, Hindu, and Latin liturgical influences, blended with local customs and later elements derived from indigenous Indian and European colonial contacts. Their language is Malayalam—the language of Kerala—and Syriac is used for liturgical purposes.

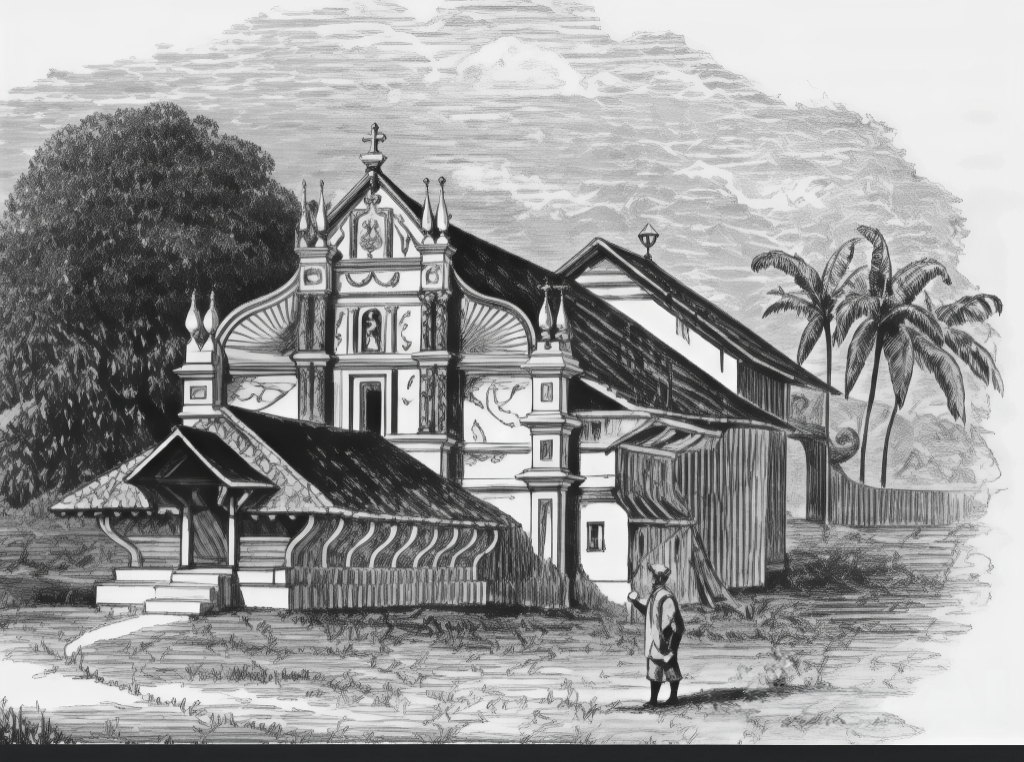
Old Karingachira Church which was seen by Anglican Missionary Dr. Claudius Buchanan in 1806

Jewish influence has been observed in Malabar Nasrani liturgy and traditions. Their celebration of Mass was and still is called the Qurbana, which is derived from the Aramaic language term Qurbana (ܩܘܪܒܢܐ), meaning "sacrifice". Nasrani Qurbana used to be held in Syriac until the early 20th century. Saint Thomas Christians typically follow the social customs of their Hindu neighbours, and their devotional practices can show the vestiges of Hindu symbolism. Social sins like untouchability entered their practices, and the Synod of Diamper abolished it. The sacraments related to birth, marriage, pregnancy, death, etc., also adapted nuances from Hindu religious practices. Even today, tying Minnu, a Hindu symbol of marriage, is the most important rite in Christian marriages. In 1519, Portuguese traveler Duarte Barbosa, on his visit to Malabar, commented on the practice of Saint Thomas Christian priests using Kudumi similar to that of Hindus in his manuscript Book of Duarte Barbosa.

In the social stratification of medieval Malabar, Saint Thomas Christians succeeded in relating their social status with that of upper-caste Hindus on account of their numerical strength and influence, and observance of many Brahmin and upper caste customs. In the 13th and 14th centuries, many Saint Thomas Christians were involved in the pepper trade for the local rulers, and many were appointed as port revenue officers. The local rulers rewarded them with grants of land and many other privileges. With growing numerical strength, a large number of Saint Thomas Christians settled in the inland pepper-growing regions. They had the right to recruit and train soldiers, and Christian trainers were given the honorary title Panikkar like their Nair counterparts. They were also entitled to collect the tax, and the tax collectors were honored with the title Tharakan.

Like Brahmins, they had the right to sit before the kings and ride horses or elephants like the royals. They were protectors of seventeen lower castes and communities and hence were called Lords of Seventeen Castes. They did not allow the lower castes to join their community for fear that it could imperil their upper-caste status. The regal period ended when the community fell under the power of the rajas of Cochin and Travancore. They owned a large number of Kalaripayattu training centers, and the rajas of Travancore and Cochin, including the renowned Marthanda Varma, recruited trained Christian warriors to defend their kingdom.

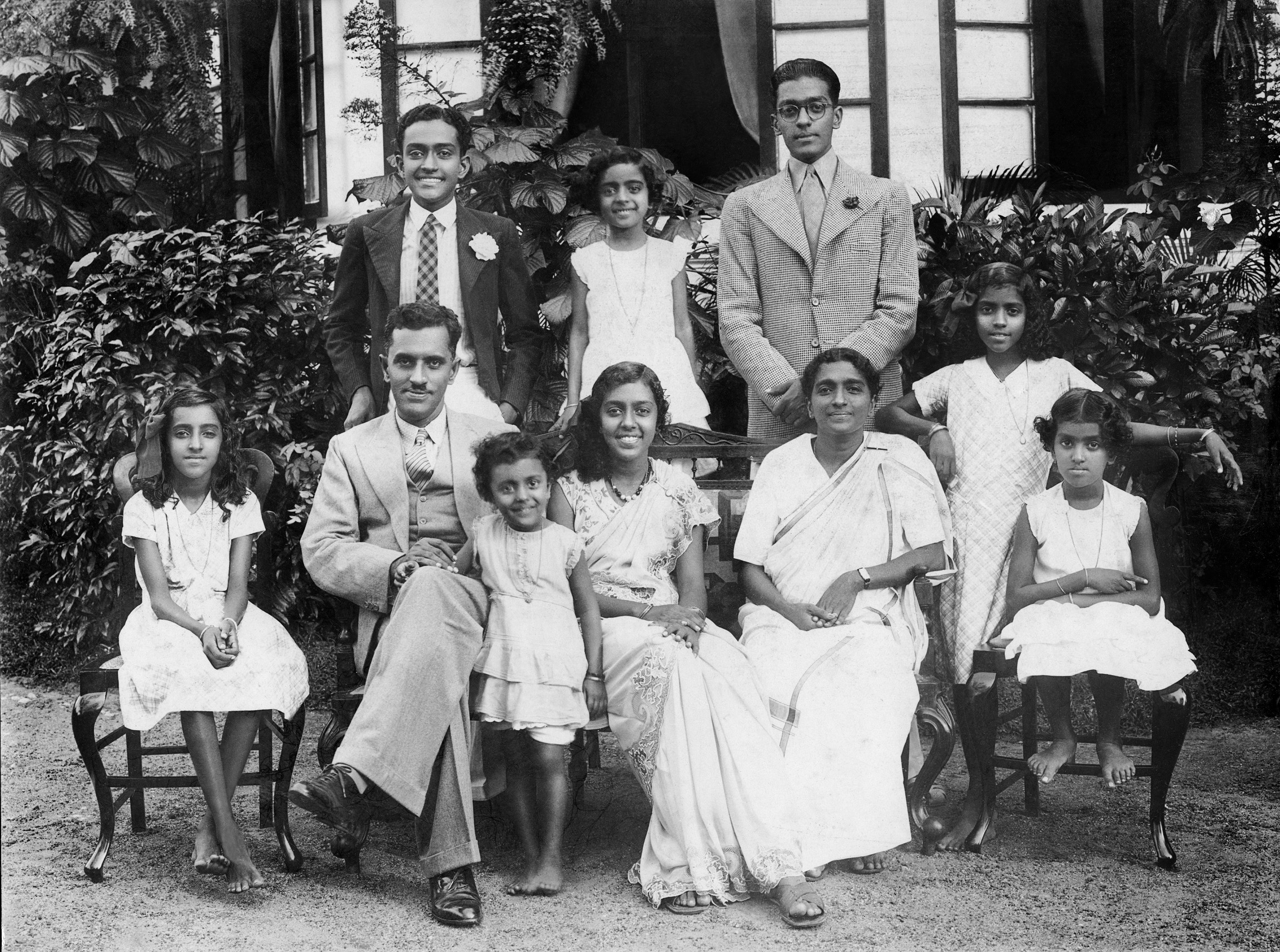
A Saint Thomas Syrian Christian family from Thiruvalla (1937)

Upper-caste Hindus and Saint Thomas Christians took part in one another's festival celebrations. In some places in Kerala, the Hindu temples and Saint Thomas Christian churches were built on adjoining sites by the Hindu kings. Until the 19th century, Saint Thomas Christians had the right of access to Hindu temples, and some leading Saint Thomas Christians held the status of sponsors at Hindu shrines and temple festivals. In the 19th century, however, Saint Thomas Christian integration with the Hindu caste system was disrupted: their clean-caste status was questioned in some localities, and they were denied access to many Hindu temples. They tried to retaliate by denouncing Hindu festivals as heathen idolatry. Clashes between upper-caste Hindus and Saint Thomas Christians occurred beginning in the late 1880s, especially when festivals coincided. Internecine violence among various Saint Thomas Christian denominations aggravated their problems.

=== Existing traditions, music, rituals and social life ===
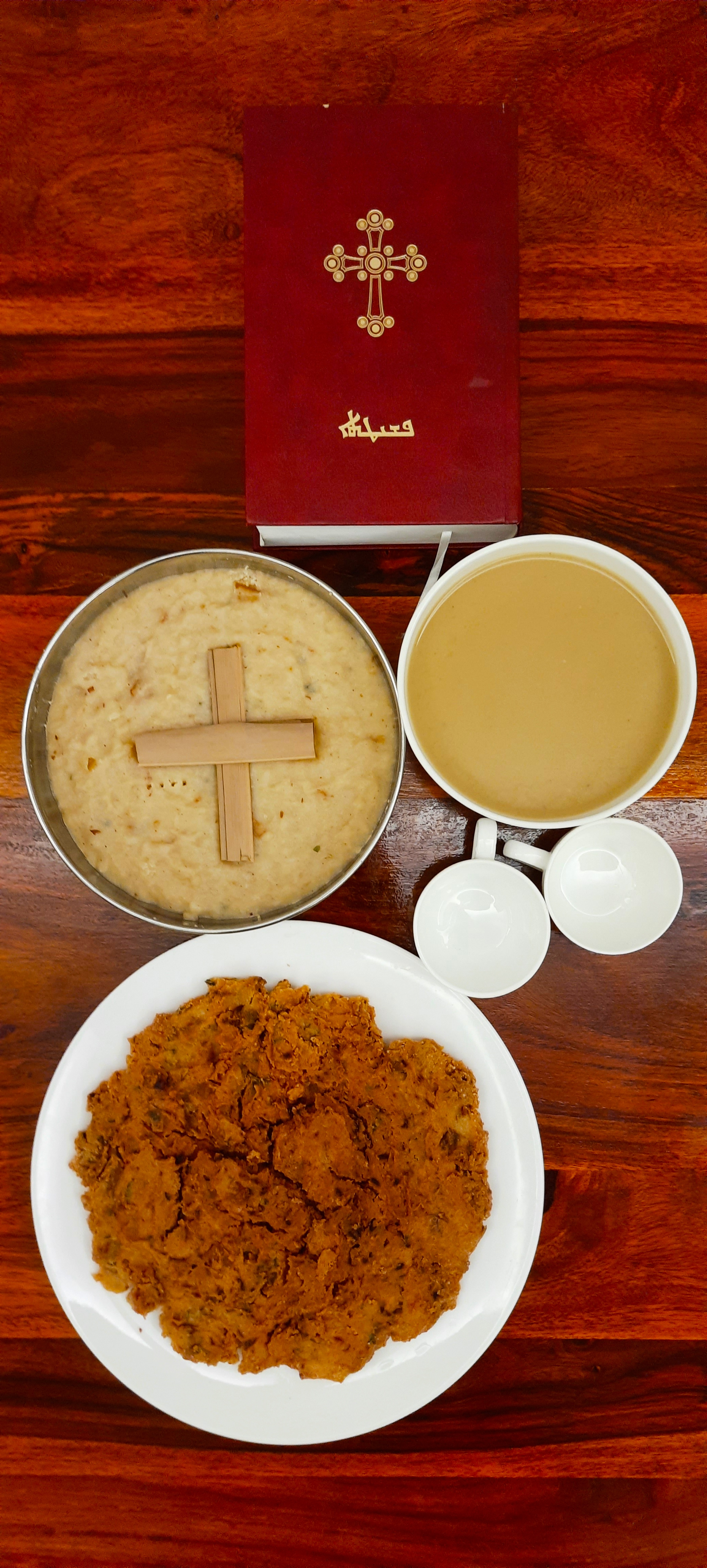
Pesaha Appam (unleavened bread) similar to a matzah is prepared on Maundy Thursday to commemorate the Passover of the Lord, rooted in its Jewish traditions.

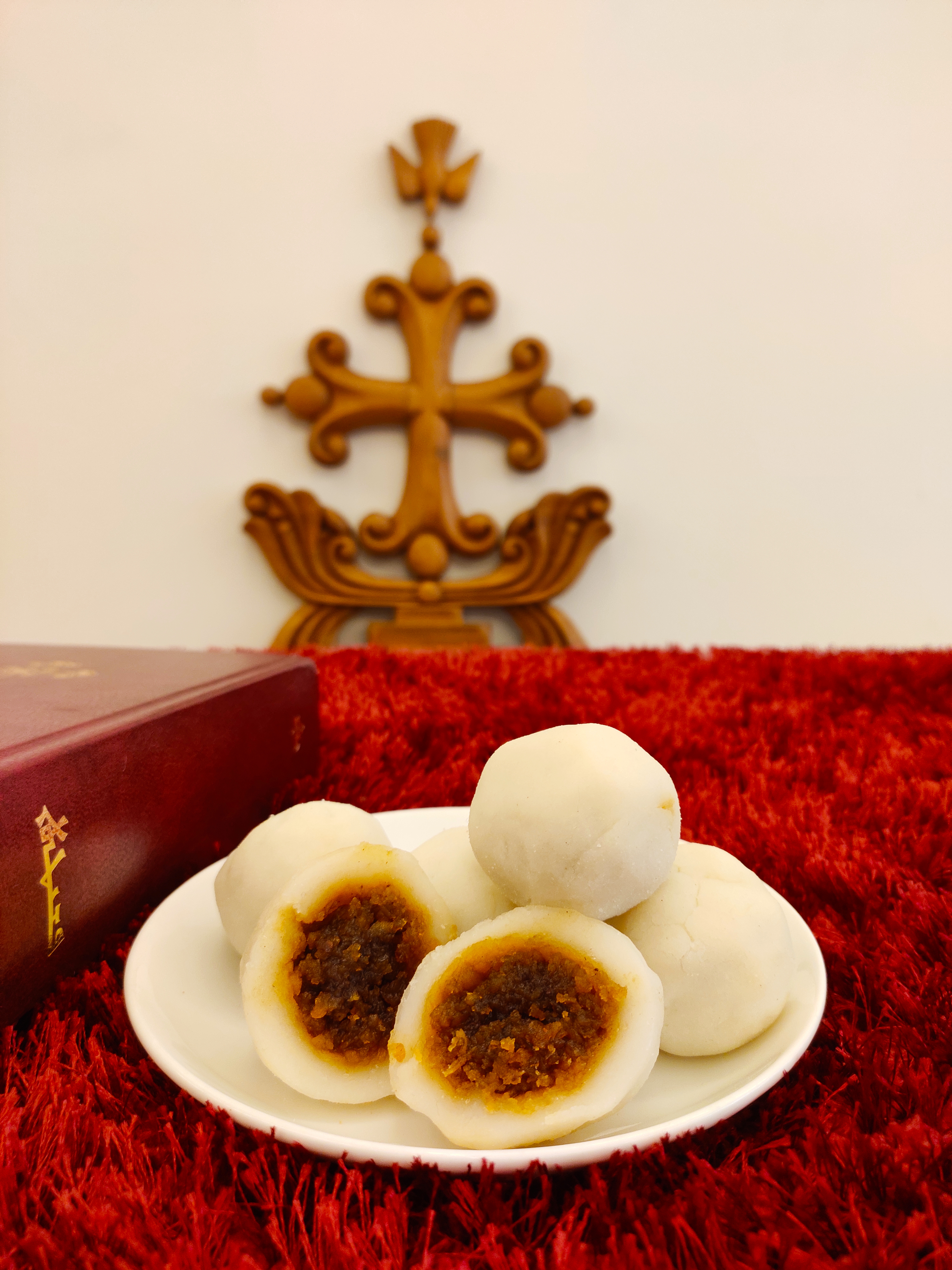
Kozhukkatta is prepared by Nasranis on the Saturday prior to Palm Sunday and the day is hence called Kozhukatta Saturday.

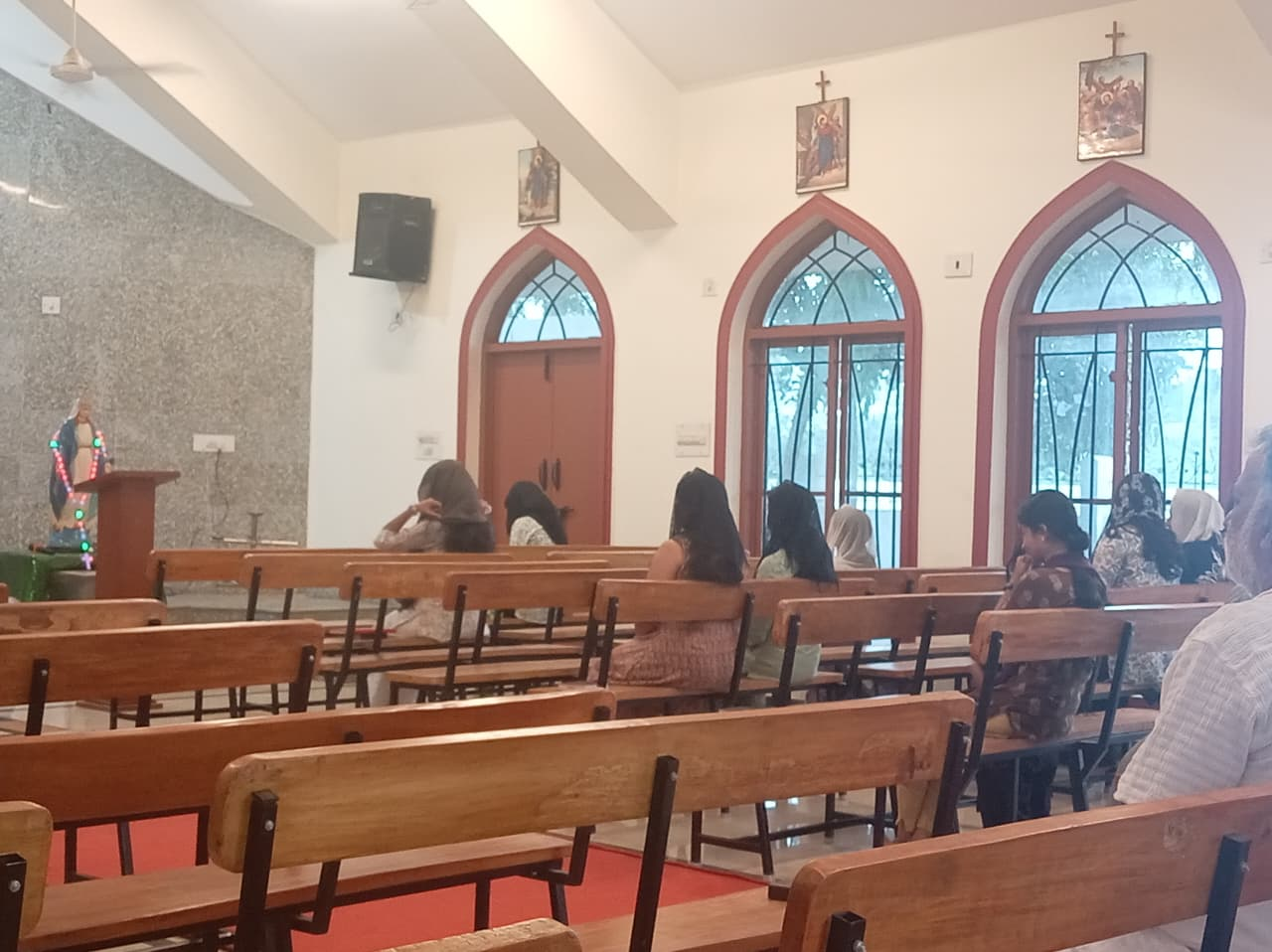
Saint Thomas Christian women cover their heads with a shawl, scarf or nettu (mantilla).

Saint Thomas Christians still retain many of their ancient traditions and rituals, both in their social and religious life. Before the 1970s, the Nasrani Qurbana was sung only in Syriac. Many of the tunes of Saint Thomas Christian worship in Kerala, especially those in the East Syriac tradition, are remnants of Syriac tunes of antiquity.

- Saint Thomas Christians observe Holy Thursday with high reverence. The day is referred to as Pesaha, a Malayalam word derived from the Aramaic or Hebrew word for Passover—Pasha or Pesakh (פסח). The tradition of consuming Pesaha Appam after the church service is observed by the entire community under the leadership of the head of the family. Special long services followed by the Qurbana are conducted during the Pesaha eve service in the churches.
- The community observes Lent, locally called Anpathu noyambu ('the fifty days' fast') or the Valiya noyambu (Sawma Rabba, 'the Great Fast'), from Clean Monday or the preceding Sunday (called the Pētūrttà ['looking back'], this is the original practice and it still prevails among the Chaldean Syrian Church) to the day before Easter, abjuring all meat, fish and egg. They also traditionally observe a 25-day fast that ends on Christmas Day.
- Generally, footwear is removed before entering the church and women cover their heads with a veil, scarf, shawl, mantilla (known as nettu; Malayalam: നെറ്റ്), or the end of a sari during worship.
- On the day of Palm Sunday, known as Oshana or Hoshana Sunday, flowers are strewn about the sanctuary, loaned from the Hindu ritual of offering flowers, and the crowd shouts "Oshana" (ܐܘܿܫܲܥܢܵܐ ʾōshaʿnā; 'save, rescue, saviour' in Aramaic). Then, palm leaves are blessed and distributed after the Mass is recited.
- The celebration of Mass is commonly called the Holy Qurbana, regardless of whether it is the East Syriac Holy Qurbana or West Syriac Holy Qurobo. The Holy Qurbana is mostly conducted in Malayalam. However, large parts of the Holy Qurbana are sung in Syriac. During the 20th century, the Qurbana-kramam (i.e., the book containing the order of worship) was translated into English for the benefit of worshipers who lived outside Kerala and did not know how to read or write Malayalam.
- Saint Thomas Christians use East Syriac term Māràn Īshoʿ Mîshîħa (Jesus's name in Aramaic) to refer to Jesus of Nazareth.
- The Saint Thomas Christians, particularly of the West Syriac Rite, pray the canonical hours of the Shehimo seven times a day.
- Another surviving tradition is the use of muthukkuda (ornamental umbrella) for church celebrations, marriages, and other festivals. The church celebrations include traditional drums, arch decorations, ornamental umbrellas, and Panchavadyam. Their use has become popular all over Kerala.
- The sacraments and ceremonies of Saint Thomas Christians related to house-building, birth, and marriage have close similarity with those of Hindus in Kerala. The sacrament of death reflects Christian canonical themes to a limited extent, with a noticeably significant influence from Hindu culture. Emphasis is placed on concepts related to eternal life after death and the anticipation of Jesus's final coming.
- Saint Thomas Christians do not marry close relatives. The rule is that the bride and groom must not be related for at least five or seven generations.
- Saint Thomas Christians generally prefer arranged marriages, and the prospective partners see each other in the Pennukanal (bride-viewing) ceremony at the bride's home.
- Saint Thomas Christian marriage customs are uniquely different from Western Christian marriage and local Hindu marriage customs. For example, engagement and marriage are usually performed together in the same service. Unlike Western Christian traditions, there is no direct ring exchange between groom and bride during engagement; rather, it is offered and mediated by the Kathanar, who represents Jesus, symbolising that it is God who brings the couple together into marriage. The tying of the Minnu (Mangalasutra) and the giving of the "Manthrakodi" or "Pudava" to the bride are the major wedding rituals loaned from Hinduism. Manthrakodi, a silk saree with a golden zari border, is blessed by the priest and is placed by the bridegroom by covering the hair of the bride; it symbolises the "Pudavakodukkal" ceremony of the Nambudiri Brahmins, wherein the bridegroom places a silk cloth by covering the head of the bride.
- Saint Thomas Christians widely use Nilavilakku (a lighted metal lamp), Kindi, Kalasha, and other bronze articles in their houses and churches.
- The night before the marriage, a ceremony known as Madhuram Veppu is conducted. The ceremony is conducted separately for the bride and the groom. It includes the maternal uncle serving the bride and groom sweets. The tradition is borrowed from the Knanaya (Southist) community's tradition called Chantham Charthal, wherein the couple is served sweets. Chantham Charthal for the bride includes applying Henna, Sandalwood, and turmeric over the palms and legs as a symbol of purity. The groom's face is cleanly shaved as part of a ritual. All the traditions are accompanied by the Panan Pattu performed by the Panan caste, who sings the grants and privileges given to the Syrian Christians.
- The traditional dress of a Saint Thomas Christian woman is the Chattayum Mundum, a seamless white garment now limited to older female adherents. Following the general trend, the Sari and Churidar have become predominant among the younger generations.
- Many artforms, such as Margamkali (an ancient dance form performed in a circular configuration with a Nilavilakku at the centre) and Parichamuttukali (an ancient martial dance form in which Syrian Christian men with swords and shields follow the movements and steps of Kalaripayattu), still exist amongst the Saint Thomas Syrian Christian community.
- A vachanapetty (Malayalam: വചനപ്പെട്ടി) is a spiritual box filled with Biblical verses, each written on a small slip. These verses are selected at random during prayer.

=== Church architecture ===
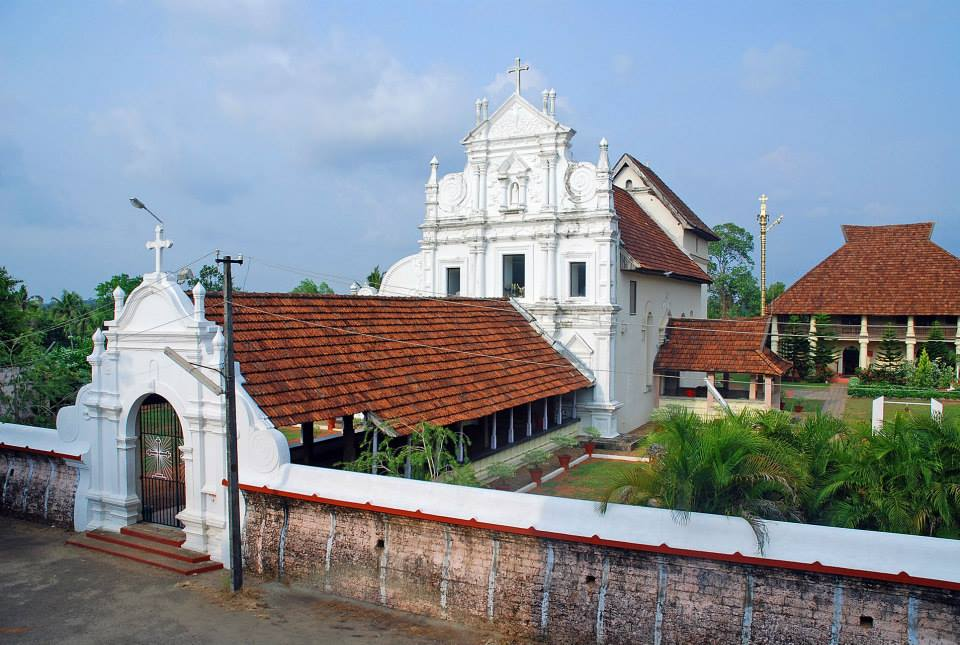
Kottayam Saint Mary's Minor Church (Kottayam Cheriyapally) with the traditional tile roofing and wall

The earliest documentary evidence is the Quilon Syrian copper plates, which refers to the construction of the church of Tharisapally in Quilon between 823 and 849 AD. Antonio Gouvea, Portuguese envoy to Malabar, mentions in his 16th-century work Jornada that almost all the churches of Saint Thomas Christians followed the models of Hindu temples of that period, but were distinguished by the huge granite cross in the front yard of the church. Despite the external similarity with temples, the structuring of the church's interior space always followed the East Syriac architectural theology. Thus, the contemporary style is formed as an amalgamation of Indian architecture and Assyrian liturgical concepts. The church is arranged east-to-west, with the interior structured into three levels: the madbaha (sanctuary), the qestroma (choir), and the haykla (nave).

The madbaha, arranged in the topmost platform at the eastern side of the building, represents Heaven. The primary altar is attached to the eastern wall. To the north of the madbaha is the diaqonikon (sacristry); to the south is the baptistery. The madbaha is protected with rails and is veiled by a red curtain most of the time; this is opened during the Holy Qurbana (Eucharist). An oil lamp within the sanctuary is always kept glowing to represent God's presence. The madbaha is connected to the qestroma and haykla by a low-walled path called the sqaqona. The qestroma contains seats for the choir and lower clergy. The haykla contains an elevated platform or bema, which includes an altar, two lecterns for reading, and chairs for higher clergy. Worshipers stand before the altar, with separate seating for men and women.

The main entrance is on the western side of the building; a vestibule, pillars, pilasters, and other architectural ornaments adorn the front end, and a flag mast stands in the front yard. One or two bells are installed in the backyard to signal the timing of ritual services, the death of a church member, or to inform the public of calamities.

=== The Persian Crosses ===
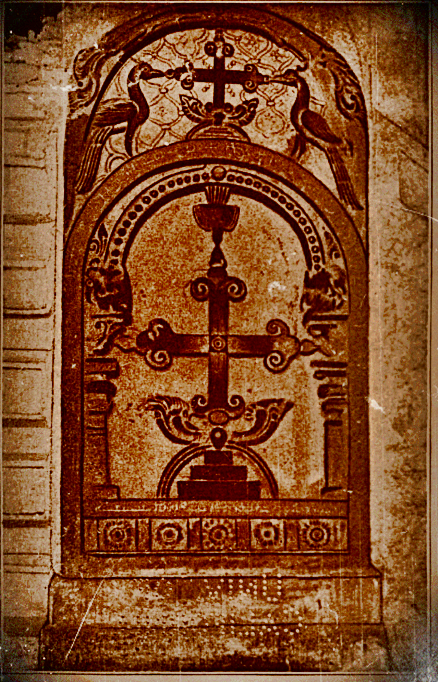
An ancient St Thomas Cross at Kottayam Knanaya Valiyapally

The East Syriac churches of the Saint Thomas Christians use the Persian cross as their symbol. They call it the "Nasrani Menorah" or "Mar Thoma Sleeva" (St. Thomas's Cross). There are several interpretations for the Saint Thomas Christian symbol. The interpretation, based on Jewish tradition, assumes that its design was based on the Jewish Temple Menorah, an ancient symbol in Judaism, which consists of a seven-branched lamp stand (candelabra). The St. Thomas Cross also appears on the official emblem of the Malankara Orthodox Syrian Church.

The interpretation, based on local culture, states that the cross—without the figure of Jesus—with flowery arms symbolising "joyfulness" points to the resurrection theology of Paul, and the downward-facing bird (most likely a dove) on the top represents the role of the Holy Spirit in the resurrection of Jesus. The cross indicates Jesus. The lotus symbolizes God the Father, who has begotten the Son in Christianity. The three steps indicate Calvary and symbolise the Church, the channel of grace flowing from the cross. The lotus may also symbolise the cultural association with Buddhism, and the cross over it shows that Indian Christianity was established in the region in which Buddhism arose.

== Christian conventions ==
The Maramon Convention is one of the largest annual Christian gatherings in Asia. It takes place in Maramon, near Kozhencherry, during February on the vast sand-bed of the Pamba River next to the Kozhencherry Bridge. The first convention was held in March 1895 for 10 days.

Another major convention in Kerala is the annual Central Travancore Convention held at Saint Stephen's Cathedral, Makamkunnu of the Malankara Orthodox Syrian Church. The first convention was held in 1915.

One of the biggest conventions of the Malankara Orthodox Syrian Church is the Kallooppara Orthodox Convention. It takes place on the Koithottu sand banks of the Manimala River with over 5,000 annual participants. This convention was started in 1943 lasting 8 days.

Ranni Orthodox Convention is an annual convention of the Malankara Orthodox Syrian Church. The convention is now held in Ranni town at Mar Gregorios Catholicate Centre and began in 1967.

Mallapally Orthodox Syrian Convention of the Malankara Orthodox Syrian Church is an annual convention in Mallapally, Pathanamthitta. The first convention took place in 1989 at Mallapally Valiyapally (St. John's Bethany Orthodox Valiyapally).

Trivandrum Orthodox Convention is an annual convention organized by Trivandrum Orthodox Diocese. The convention takes place at Holy Trinity Aramana, Ulloor and was started in 1988.

== Notable Saint Thomas Christians ==
=== In literature ===
In The God of Small Things by Arundhati Roy and The Covenant of Water by Abraham Verghese, the novels feature a Syrian Christian family.

== See also ==
- Saint Thomas Christian denominations
- Indo-Persian ecclesiastical relations
- India (East Syriac ecclesiastical province)
- Nestorianism and the church in India
- Christianity in Kerala
- Christianity in India
- Churches of Kerala
- Suriyani Malayalam

== Bibliography ==
- Amaladass, Anand (1993) [1989 (New York: Orbis Books)]. "Dialogue between Hindus and the St. Thomas Christians". In Coward, Harold (ed.). Hindu-Christian dialogue: perspectives and encounters (Indian ed.). Delhi: Motilal Banarsidass. ISBN 978-81-208-1158-4.
- Ananthakrishna Iyer, L. K. (1926). Anthropology of Syrian Christians.
- Bayly, Susan (2004). Saints, Goddesses and Kings: Muslims and Christians in South Indian Society, 1700–1900. Cambridge: Cambridge University Press. ISBN 9780521891035.
- Baum, Wilhelm; Winkler, Dietmar W. (2003). The Church of the East: A Concise History. London-New York: Routledge-Curzon. ISBN 9781134430192.
- Brock, Sebastian P. (2011a). "Thomas Christians". In Sebastian P. Brock; Aaron M. Butts; George A. Kiraz; Lucas Van Rompay (eds.). Gorgias Encyclopedic Dictionary of the Syriac Heritage: Electronic Edition. Gorgias Press.
- Brock, Sebastian P. (2011b). "Malankara Catholic Church". In Sebastian P. Brock; Aaron M. Butts; George A. Kiraz; Lucas Van Rompay (eds.). Gorgias Encyclopedic Dictionary of the Syriac Heritage: Electronic Edition. Gorgias Press.
- Brock, Sebastian P. (2011c). "Chaldean Syrian Church". In Sebastian P. Brock; Aaron M. Butts; George A. Kiraz; Lucas Van Rompay (eds.). Gorgias Encyclopedic Dictionary of the Syriac Heritage: Electronic Edition. Gorgias Press.
- Brock, Sebastian P. (2011d). "Malabar Catholic Church". In Sebastian P. Brock; Aaron M. Butts; George A. Kiraz; Lucas Van Rompay (eds.). Gorgias Encyclopedic Dictionary of the Syriac Heritage: Electronic Edition. Gorgias Press.
- Brown, Leslie W. (1956). The Indian Christians of St Thomas: An Account of the Ancient Syrian Church of Malabar. Cambridge: Cambridge University Press.
- Cariatti, Joseph (1782). "Noticias do Reyno do Malabar" Information of the Kingdom of Malabar. National Library of Paris.
- Chaput, Pascale (1999). "La Double identité des chrétiens keralais: confessions et castes chrétiennes au Kerala (Inde du Sud) / The Double Identity of Kerala Christians: Confessions and Christian Castes (South India)". Archives de sciences sociales des religions. 106: 5–23. doi:10.3406/assr.1999.1084.
- Childers, Jeff W. (2011). "Thomas, Acts of.". In Sebastian P. Brock; Aaron M. Butts; George A. Kiraz; Lucas Van Rompay (eds.). Gorgias Encyclopedic Dictionary of the Syriac Heritage: Electronic Edition. Gorgias Press.
- Collins, Paul M. (2007). Christian inculturation in India. Ashgate Publishing. ISBN 978-0-7546-6076-7.
- Devika, J.; Varghese, V. J. (March 2010). To Survive or to flourish? Minority rights and Syrian Christian assertions in 20th century Travancore (PDF). Trivandrum: Centre for Development Studies. Archived from the original (PDF) on 26 May 2012.
- Fenwick, John R. K. (2011a). "Malabar Independent Syrian Church". In Sebastian P. Brock; Aaron M. Butts; George A. Kiraz; Lucas Van Rompay (eds.). Gorgias Encyclopedic Dictionary of the Syriac Heritage: Electronic Edition. Gorgias Press.
- Fenwick, John R. K. (2011b). "Mar Thoma Syrian Church (Malankara)". In Sebastian P. Brock; Aaron M. Butts; George A. Kiraz; Lucas Van Rompay (eds.). Gorgias Encyclopedic Dictionary of the Syriac Heritage: Electronic Edition. Gorgias Press.
- Fernando, Leonard; Gispert-Sauch, G. (2004). Christianity in India: Two Thousand Years of Faith. Penguin Books India. ISBN 9780670057696.
- Frykenberg, Robert E. (2008). Christianity in India: From Beginnings to the Present. Oxford: Oxford University Press. ISBN 9780198263777.
- Joseph, Thomas (2011). "Malankara Syriac Orthodox Church". In Sebastian P. Brock; Aaron M. Butts; George A. Kiraz; Lucas Van Rompay (eds.). Gorgias Encyclopedic Dictionary of the Syriac Heritage: Electronic Edition. Gorgias Press.
- Kiraz, George A. (2011a). "Maphrian". In Sebastian P. Brock; Aaron M. Butts; George A. Kiraz; Lucas Van Rompay (eds.). Gorgias Encyclopedic Dictionary of the Syriac Heritage: Electronic Edition. Gorgias Press.
- Klijn, Albertus Frederik Johannes (2003). The Acts of Thomas: Introduction, Text, and Commentary. BRILL. ISBN 90-04-12937-5.
- Kollaparambil, Jacob (1992). The Babylonian origin of the Southists among the St. Thomas Christians. Pontifical Oriental Institute. ISBN 8872102898.
- Kollaparambil, Jacob (2012). Kottayam Athirupatha Sathabdhi Smaranika: Sabha Saktheekaranam Knanaya Presthithadauthyam. Catholic Mission Press Kottayam.
- Kollaparambil, Jacob (2015). Sources of the Syro Malabar Law. Oriental Institute of Religious Studies India. ISBN 9789382762287.
- Koonammakkal, Thomas (2013). "Syro-Malabar History and Traditions". In Bruns, Peter; Luthe, Heinz Otto (eds.). Orientalia Christiana: Festschrift für Hubert Kaufhold zum 70. Geburtstag. Wiesbaden: Harrassowitz Verlag. pp. 259–276. ISBN 9783447068857.
- Liščák, Vladimír (2018). "Mapa mondi (Catalan Atlas of 1375), Majorcan cartographic school, and 14th century Asia" (PDF). In C. A. Brewer (ed.). Proceedings of the International Cartographic Association. 28th International Cartographic Conference: 2–7 July 2017, Washington DC, USA. Vol. 1. Art. 69. Bibcode:2018PrICA...1...69L. doi:10.5194/ica-proc-1-69-2018.
- Malekandathil, Pius (2003). Jornada of D. Alexis Menezes: A Portuguese Account of the Sixteenth Century Malabar. LRC Publications. ISBN 81-88979-00-7.
- Malekandathil, Pius (2010). Maritime India: Trade, Religion and Polity in the Indian Ocean. Delhi: Primus Books. ISBN 978-93-8060-701-6.
- Malekandathil, Pius (28 January 2013). "Nazrani History and Discourse on Early Nationalism in Varthamanapusthakam". NSC Network.
- Malekandathil, Pius (19 March 2014). "Nazrani Christians and the Social Processes of Kerala, 800–1500". NSC Network.
- Medlycott, A. (1912). "St. Thomas Christians". The Catholic Encyclopedia. New York: Robert Appleton Company.
- Menachery, George (2000). Thomapedia. Thomapedia. ISBN 81-87132-13-2. OCLC 56405161.
- Menachery, George, ed. (1982). The St. Thomas Christian Encyclopedia of India. Vol. I. Trichur: St. Thomas Christian Encyclopaedia of India.
- Menachery, George, ed. (1973). The St. Thomas Christian Encyclopedia of India. Vol. II. Trichur: St. Thomas Christian Encyclopaedia of India.
- Menachery, George, ed. (2010). The St. Thomas Christian Encyclopedia of India. Vol. III. Trichur: St. Thomas Christian Encyclopaedia of India.
- Menachery, George, ed. (1998). The Indian Church History Classics, Vol. I, The Nazranies. Ollur, Trichur, India: South Asia Research Assistance Services. ISBN 81-87133-05-8.
- Mingana, Alphonse (1926). "The Early Spread of Christianity in India" (PDF). Bulletin of the John Rylands Library. 10 (2): 435–514. doi:10.7227/BJRL.10.2.7.
- Mooken, Aprem (1975). Mar Abimalek Timotheus: A Biography. Trichur: Mar Narsai Press.
- Mooken, Aprem (1977). The Chaldean Syrian Church in India. Trichur: Mar Narsai Press.
- Mooken, Aprem (1983). The Chaldean Syrian Church of the East. Delhi: National Council of Churches in India.
- Mooken, Aprem (1987). Mar Abdisho Thondanat: A Biography. Trichur: Mar Narsai Press.
- Moraes, George M. (1964). A History of Christianity in India: From Early Times to St. Francis Xavier: A. D. 52-1542. Bombay: Manaktalas.
- Mundadan, Anthony Mathias (1943). History of Christianity in India. Vol. 1. Bangalore: Church History Association of India.
- Mundadan, Anthony Mathias; Thekkedath, Joseph (1982). History of Christianity in India. Vol. 2. Bangalore: Church History Association of India.
- Mundadan, Anthony Mathias (1967). The Arrival of the Portuguese in India and the Thomas Christians Under Mar Jacob, 1498–1552. Bangalore: Dharmaram College.
- Mundadan, Anthony Mathias (1970). Sixteenth century traditions of St. Thomas Christians. Bangalore: Dharmaram College.
- Mundadan, Anthony Mathias (1984). Indian Christians: Search for Identity and Struggle for Autonomy. Bangalore: Dharmaram College.
- Nedungatt, George (2001). The Synod of Diamper Revisisted. Pontificio Istituto Orientale. ISBN 8872103312.
- Neill, Stephen (1984) [1966]. Colonialism and Christian Missions. New York: McGraw-Hill.
- Neill, Stephen (2004) [1984]. A History of Christianity in India: The Beginnings to AD 1707. Cambridge: Cambridge University Press. ISBN 9780521548854.
- Neill, Stephen (2002) [1985]. A History of Christianity in India: 1707-1858. Cambridge: Cambridge University Press. ISBN 9780521893329.
- Palackal, Joseph J. (2016). "The Survival Story of the Syriac Chants among the Saint Thomas Christians in South India". In Suzel Ana Reily; Jonathan M. Dueck (eds.). The Oxford Handbook of Music and World Christianities. Oxford University Press. ISBN 978-0-19-061417-1.
- Perczel, István (2011). "Four apologetic church histories from India". In Baby Varghese; Jacob Thekeparampil; Abraham Kalakudi (eds.). The Harp. Vol. 24. Gorgias Press. pp. 189–218. ISBN 9781463233136.
- Perczel, István (2013). "Some New Documents on the Struggle of the Saint Thomas Christians to Maintain the Chaldaean Rite and Jurisdiction". In Peter Bruns; Heinz Otto Luthe (eds.). Orientalia Christiana: Festschrift für Hubert Kaufhold zum 70. Geburtstag. Wiesbaden: Harrassowitz Verlag. pp. 415–436.
- Perczel, István (2018). "Syriac Christianity in India". In Daniel King (ed.). The Syriac World. Routledge. pp. 653–697. ISBN 978-1-317-48211-6.
- Podipara, Placid J. (1970). The Thomas Christians. London: Darton, Longman and Tidd.
- Podipara, Placid (1971). The Varthamanappusthakam. Pontifical Oriental Institute. ISBN 978-81-2645-152-4.
- Pothan, S.G. (1963). The Syrian Christians of Kerala. Bombay: Asia Publishing House.
- Prasad, Rajendra (2009). A Historical-Developmental Study of Classical Indian Philosophy of Morals. History of Science, Philosophy, and Culture in Indian Civilization. Vol. 12. Delhi, India: Concept Publishing Company. ISBN 978-81-8069-595-7.
- Swiderski, Richard M. (1988). Blood weddings: the Knanaya Christians of Kerala. New Era Publications. OCLC 614902709.
- Swiderski, Richard Michael (1988a). "Northists and Southists: A Folklore of Kerala Christians". Asian Folklore Studies. 47 (1). Nanzan University: 76–80, 80–83. doi:10.2307/1178253. JSTOR 1178253.
- Takahashi, Hidemi (2011). "Diamper, Synod of". In Sebastian P. Brock; Aaron M. Butts; George A. Kiraz; Lucas Van Rompay (eds.). Gorgias Encyclopedic Dictionary of the Syriac Heritage: Electronic Edition. Gorgias Press.
- Thalian, George (1961). The Great Archbishop Augustine W. Kandathil, D. D.: the Outline of a Vocation. Bp. Louis memorial press.
- Thomas, Sonja (2018). Privileged Minorities:Syrian Christianity, Gender, and Minority Rights in Postcolonial India. University of Washington Press.
- Tisserant, E. (1957). E. R. Hambye (ed.). Eastern Christianity in India: A History of the Syro-Malabar Church from the Earliest Times to the Present Day. Translated by E. R. Hambye. Westminster, MD: Newman Press.
- Vadakkekara, Benedict (2007). Origin of Christianity in India: A Historiographical Critique. Delhi: Media House. ISBN 9788174952585.
- Van der Ploeg, J. P. M. (1983). The Christians of St. Thomas in South India and their Syriac Manuscripts. Rome; Bangalore: Center for Indian and Inter-Religious Studies; Dharmaram Publications.
- Varghese, Baby (2011). "Malankara Orthodox Syrian Church". In Sebastian P. Brock; Aaron M. Butts; George A. Kiraz; Lucas Van Rompay (eds.). Gorgias Encyclopedic Dictionary of the Syriac Heritage: Electronic Edition. Gorgias Press.
- Vellian, Jacob (1986). Symposium on Knanites. Syrian Church Series. Vol. 12. Jyothi Book House.
- Walker, Joel T. (2011). "Fars". In Sebastian P. Brock; Aaron M. Butts; George A. Kiraz; Lucas Van Rompay (eds.). Gorgias Encyclopedic Dictionary of the Syriac Heritage: Electronic Edition. Gorgias Press.
- Wilmshurst, David (2000). The Ecclesiastical Organisation of the Church of the East, 1318–1913. Louvain: Peeters Publishers. ISBN 9789042908765.
- Zachariah, K. C. (2006). The Syrian Christians of Kerala: Demographic and Socioeconomic Transition in the Twentieth Century. Thiruvananthapuram: Orient Longman. ISBN 9788125030096.

=== Primary sources ===
- Eusebius. Knight, Kevin (ed.). Church History. Translated by McGiffert, Arthur Cushman.. Book V Chapter 10 "Pantaenus the Philosopher".
