= Yohannan (Yoseph of Awgin) =

Indian bishop

Mar Yohannan
- Church of the East in India
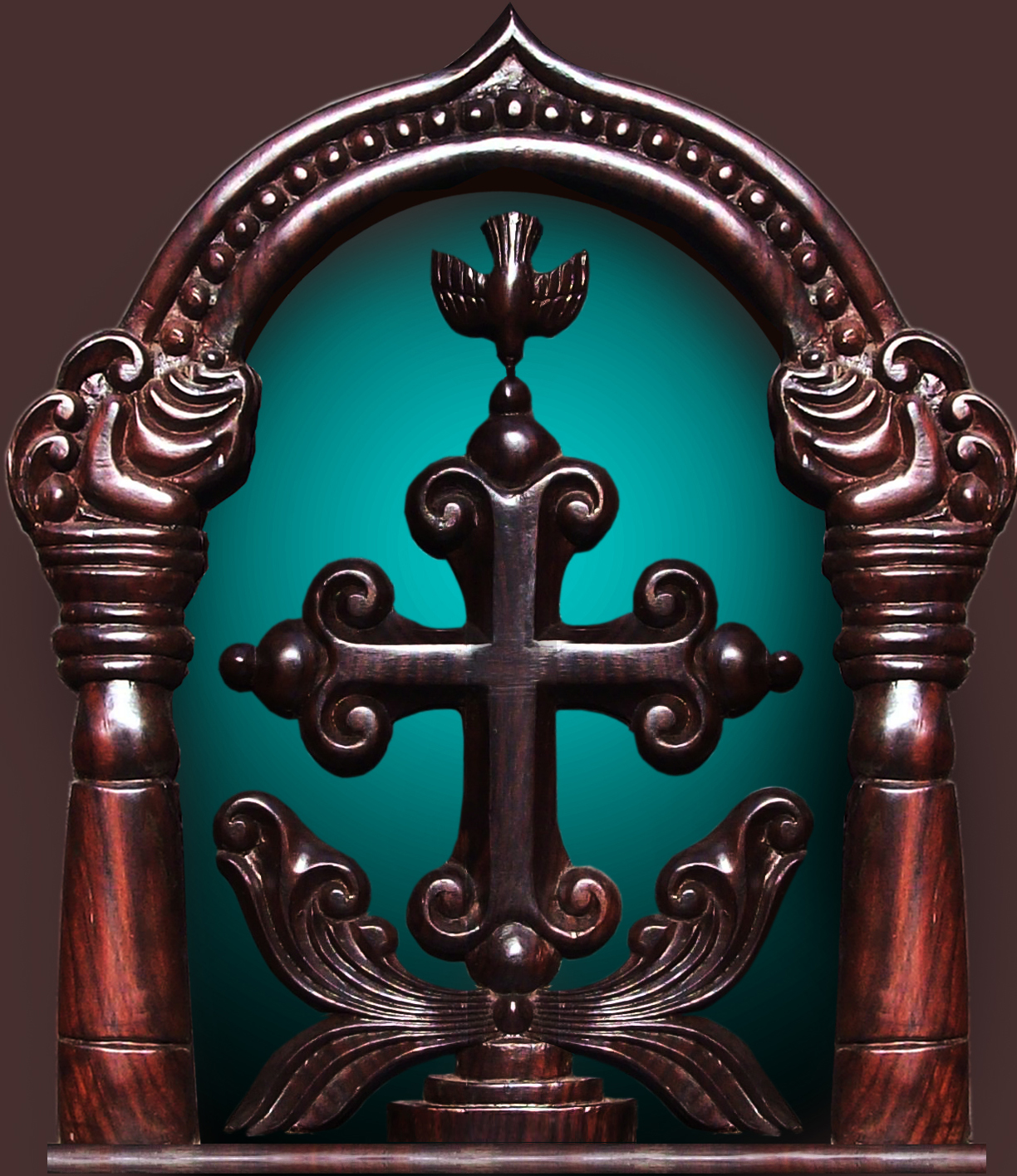
- Mar Thoma Sliva.jpg
- Church: Church of the East in India
- Diocese: India
- Installed: c. 1490
- Term ended: c. 1503
- Predecessor: Yahballaha II of India
- Successor: Mar Yacob (1503–c. 1550)

Orders
- Ordination: Shemon IV

Mar Yohannan, also known (prior to episcopal consecration) as a monk Yoseph of Awgin, was Bishop of India (c. 1490–1503), a metropolitan province of the Church of the East. In 1490, envoys of Saint Thomas Christians from the Malabar Coast in India traveled to Mesopotamia and arrived in Gazarta, bringing appeals to the hierarchy of the Church of the East, and asking for new bishops. Patriarch Shemon IV responded positively to their request and arranged the selection of two monks from the Awgin Monastery, both of them called Yoseph, appointing them as bishops, under new names: Mar Yohannan and Mar Thoma, and dispatching them to India. Mar Yohannan stayed in India, while Mar Thomas returned to Mesopotamia. In 1503, three new bishops were sent to India, by new Patriarch Eliya V: Mar Yahballaha, Mar Dinkha and Mar Yaqob. Upon arrival, they met with Mar Yohannan. Activities of Mar Yohannan and other bishops reaffirmed traditional ties between Christians of India and the Church of the East. By that time, local Christians of the Malabar Coast were also facing some additional challenges, caused by the establishment of Portuguese presence in India.

== Bishop in India ==
Church of the East and its dioceses and missions throughout Asia, including India

In 1490, three delegates of Saint Thomas Christians from the Malabar Coast in India traveled to Mesopotamia to meet Patriarch Shemon IV of the Church of the East. One delegate died on the way, but the remaining two, named George and Joseph, arrived there safely, and met with Patriarch in Gazarta. Both of them were ordained priests, by Mar Shemon IV, at the Church of St George in Gazerta. They were then sent to the Awgin Monastery, where two able monks, both named Yoseph, were selected to go with them to India. Patriarch consecrated both Awgin monks as Bishops, under new names: Mar Thomas and Mar Yohannan. After that, both bishops, and both of newly consecrated priests from India, traveled together to the Malabar Coast, where they arrived safely. Their activity in India was successful. They were well received by the faithful. Upon arrival, bishops were welcomed by many Christians who were singing psalms and hymns, carrying before them the cross, the Gospel and candles. During their activity, bishops ordained many new priests and consecrated altars.

Some researchers have suggested that these events did not take place around 1490, but few years later, around 1499–1500.

Mar Yohannan stayed in India, while Mar Thomas returned to Mesopotamia, to bring the offerings, sent by Christians of India to the Patriarch. This second journey is mentioned in the narrations of priest Joseph from India, who traveled to Europe. Joseph's narrations to Venetians tell us that: “The said Joseph related that he had departed from the said town of Cranganore with a Bishop, his superior. Ascending a ship, he went towards the island of Ormus. From there he proceeded to the mainland where he stayed for three months and with the said Bishop, he went as far as Armenia to meet his Pontiff. By Him, this Bishop was consecrated and the said Joseph was ordained a Priest”.

As Bishop of India, Mar Yohannan later welcomed three new bishops (Mar Yahballaha, Mar Dinkha, and Mar Yaqob), who were sent to India in 1503, by new Patriarch Eliya V. Upon arrival, they met with Mar Yohannan. That is the last known information about his activities.

== See also ==
- Christianity in India
- Church of the East
- Saint Thomas Christians
- Chaldean Syrian Church

== Sources ==
- Baum, Wilhelm; Winkler, Dietmar W. (2003). The Church of the East: A Concise History. London-New York: Routledge-Curzon. ISBN 9781134430192.
- Brown, Leslie W. (1956). The Indian Christians of St Thomas: An Account of the Ancient Syrian Church of Malabar. Cambridge: Cambridge University Press.
- Mingana, Alphonse (1926). "The Early Spread of Christianity in India" (PDF). Bulletin of the John Rylands Library. 10 (2): 435–514. doi:10.7227/BJRL.10.2.7.
- Moraes, George M. (1964). A History of Christianity in India: From Early Times to St. Francis Xavier: A. D. 52-1542. Bombay: Manaktalas.
- Mundadan, Mathias (1967). The Arrival of the Portuguese in India and the Thomas Christians Under Mar Jacob, 1498-1552. Bangalore: Dharmaram College.
- Mundadan, Mathias (1970). Sixteenth century traditions of St. Thomas Christians. Bangalore: Dharmaram College.
- Mundadan, Mathias (1984). Indian Christians: Search for Identity and Struggle for Autonomy. Bangalore: Dharmaram College.
- Murre van den Berg, Heleen H. L. (1999). "The Patriarchs of the Church of the East from the Fifteenth to Eighteenth Centuries" (PDF). Hugoye: Journal of Syriac Studies. 2 (2): 235–264.
- Neill, Stephen (2004) [1984]. A History of Christianity in India: The Beginnings to AD 1707. Cambridge: Cambridge University Press. ISBN 9780521548854.
- Wilmshurst, David (2000). The Ecclesiastical Organisation of the Church of the East, 1318–1913. Louvain: Peeters Publishers. ISBN 9789042908765.
- Wilmshurst, David (2011). The martyred Church: A History of the Church of the East. London: East & West Publishing Limited. ISBN 9781907318047.
