= Yaqob Abuna =

Metropolitan of the Church of Malabar

Mar Yaqob
- Saint Thomas Christians
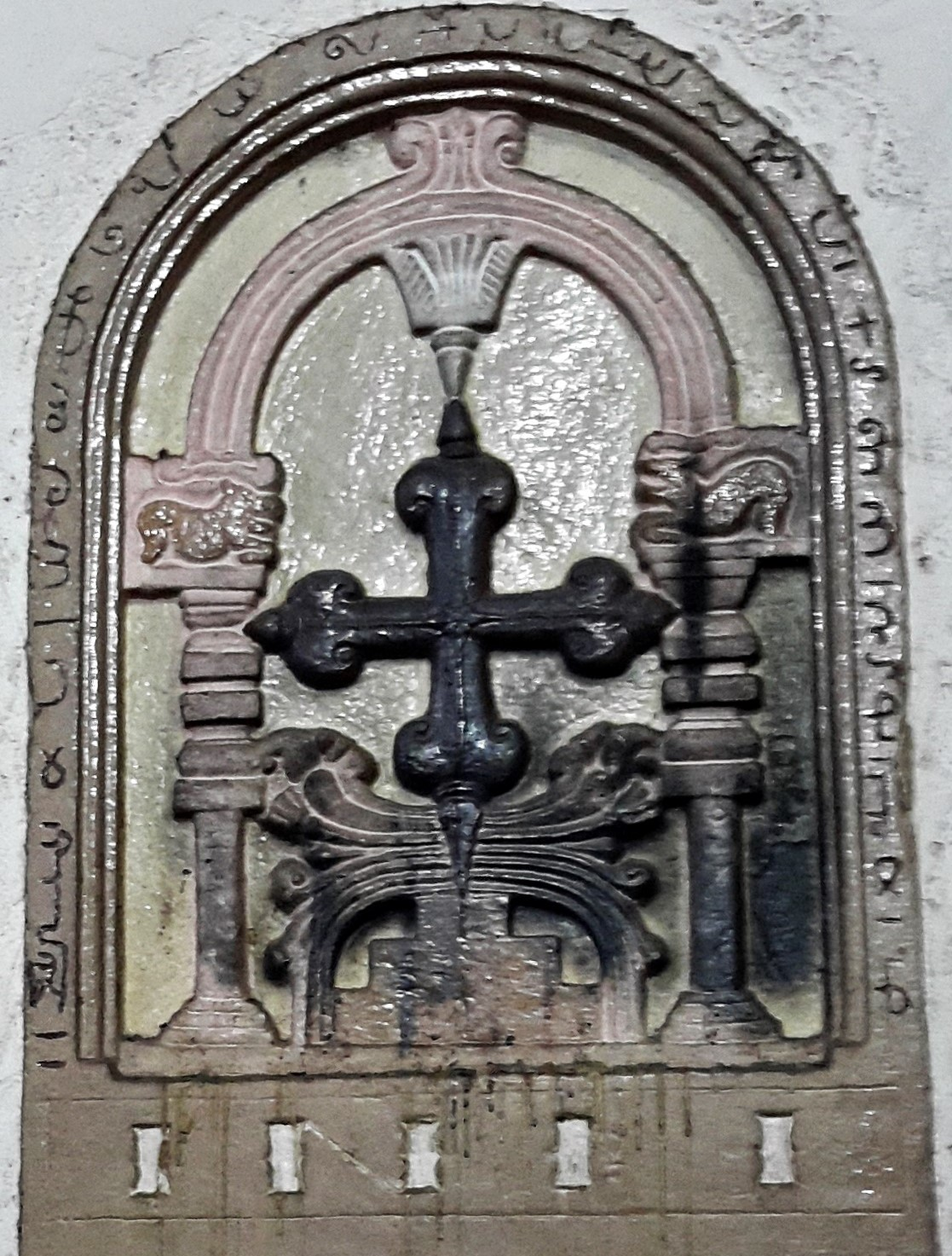
- Diocese: India
- Installed: 1503
- Term ended: 1553
- Predecessor: Mar Yohannan (1490-1503)
- Successor: Mar Joseph Sulaqa (1555-1567)

Orders
- Ordination: 1503 by Mar Elias V

Personal details
- Died: c. 1553 Cranganore (?)

Mar Yaqob Abuna was one of the metropolitans of the Church of Malabar of the Saint Thomas Christians. In 1503, Mar Eliya V, the Catholicos Patriarch of the Church of the East consecrated three bishops from the monastery of Saint Eugene: Rabban David as Mar Yaballaha, Rabban George as Mar Denha, Rabban Masud as Mar Yaqob. The Patriarch sent these new bishops, together with Mar Thomas, to the lands of the Indians, and to the islands of the seas, which are within Dabag, and to Sin and Masin- Java, China and Maha china- Great China.

== Introduction ==
=== Appointment of bishops for India, 1490–1503 ===
At the end of the fifteenth century the Church of the East responded to a request by the Saint Thomas Christians for bishops to be sent out to them. In 1490, two Christians from Malabar arrived in Gazarta to petition the East Syrian patriarch to consecrate a bishop for their church. Two monks of the monastery of Mar Awgin were consecrated bishops and were sent to India. Some researchers have suggested that these events did not take place around 1490, but few years later, around 1499-1500. The patriarch Eliya V (1503–04) consecrated three more bishops for India in April 1503. These bishops sent a report to the patriarch from India in 1504, describing the condition of the church in Malabar and reporting the recent arrival of the Portuguese. Eliya had already died by the time this letter arrived in Mesopotamia, and it was received by his successor, Shemʿon VI (1504–38).

=== The arrival of the bishops on the Malabar ===
On reaching India the bishops put in first at Cragnaoor, and introduced themselves as Christians to the twenty or so Portuguese who were living there. They were most kindly received, and helped with clothes and money. They stayed for about two and a half months. Before they left, they were invited to celebrate the holy mysteries after their own fashion: 'They prepared for it a beautiful place fit for prayer, where there was a kind of oratory. On the Sunday Nosardel [seven days after Pentecost], after their priests had celebrated, The Bishops were admitted and celebrated the Holy Sacriiiee, and it was pleasing for the foreign missionaries.

=== Accounts of foreign missionaries ===
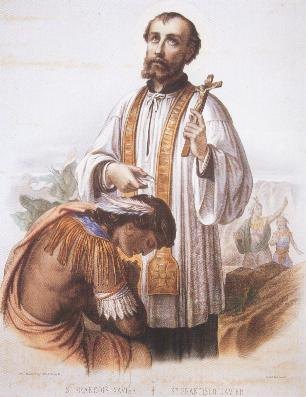
In a letter to kingJohn III of Portugal dated 26 January 1549 Francis Xavier describe Yaqob Abuna as a virtuous and saintly man

Francis Xavier wrote a letter from Cochin to king John III of Portugal on 26 January 1549, in which he declared "A bishop of Armenia (Mesopotamia by the name of Yaqob Abuna has been serving God and Your Highness in these regions for forty·five years. He is a very old, virtuous, and saintly man, and, at the same time, one who has been neglected by Your Highness and by almost all of those who are in India. God is granting him his reward, since he desires to assist him by himself, without employing us as a means to console his servants. He is being helped here solely by the priests of St. Francis Y. H. should write a very affectionate letter to him, and one of its paragraphs should include an order recommending him to the governors, to the veadores da fazenda, and to the captains of Cochin so that he may receive the honour and respect which he deserves when he comes to them with a request on behalf of the Christians of St. Thomas Your Highness should write to him and earnestly entreat him to undertake the charge of recommending you to God, since YH. has a greater need of being supported by the prayers of the bishop than the bishop has need of the temporal assistance of Y.H. He has endured much in his work with the Christians of St Thomas."

In that same year Francis Xavier also wrote to his jesuit colleague and Provincial of Portugal, Fr.Simon Rodrigues giving him the following description: »Fifteen thousand paces from Cochin there is a fortress owned by the king with the name of Ctanganore. It has a beautiful college, built by Frey Wcente, a companion of the bishop, in which there are easily a hundred students, sons of native Christians, who are named after St. Thomas. There are sixty villages of these Thomas Christians around this fortress, and the students for the college as I have said, are obtained from them There are two churches in Cranganore, one of St Thomas, which is highly revered by the Thomas Christians.

This attitude of St. Francis Xavier and the Franciscans before him does not reflect any of the animosity and intolerance that kept creeping in with the spread of the Tridentine spirit of the Counter-Reformation which tended to foster a uniformity of belief and practice. It is possible to follow young Portuguese historians like joéo Paulo Oliveira e Cosca's line of atgument, yet they seem to neutralize the Portuguese cultural nationalism in their colonial expansion and the treatment of the natives. However, documents brought out from the Portuguese national archives recently help to confirm a greater openness or pragmatism in the first half of the 16th century).

== Later years and death ==
It seems that about the year 1543 Mar Yaqob, feeling the weight of years, withdrew from active direction of the affairs of the Serra and settled in the Franciscan convent of St Antony in Cochin; he had a long-standing friendship with the friars of that convent. Though not an outstanding leader, Mar Yaqob was at man of great integrity highly respected by all who knew him. In a letter dated 26 January 1549, Xavier urges the king of Portugal to show him special favour.

One touching occurrence is related in connection with the death of Mar Yaqob. On his death bed he asked his friend Pero Sequeira to redeem for him the Knai Thoma copper plate grant recording the privileges of the Knanaya community, about which he had written to the king of Portugal in 1523, but which he had later given in pledge to a man in the interior for twenty cruzados. Before his death, he had the happiness of knowing that this had been done.

The first half century (1500–1550) of relations between the Portuguese and the Thomas Christians were, in spite of misunderstandings, on the whole marked by cordiality and good will. Mar Yaqob had maintained good relations with the Westerners throughout the long period of his episcopate, and was rewarded by the good opinions expressed by many concerning him.

== See also ==
- India (East Syrian Ecclesiastical Province)
- Christianity in India
- Church of the East
- Syrian Malabar Nasrani

== Sources ==
- Baum, Wilhelm; Winkler, Dietmar W. (2003). The Church of the East: A Concise History. London-New York: Routledge-Curzon. ISBN 978-1-134-43019-2.
- Murre van den Berg, Heleen H. L. (1999). "The Patriarchs of the Church of the East from the Fifteenth to Eighteenth Centuries" (PDF). Hugoye: Journal of Syriac Studies. 2 (2): 235–264. doi:10.31826/hug-2010-020119.
- Neill, Stephen (2004) [1984]. A History of Christianity in India: The Beginnings to AD 1707. Cambridge: Cambridge University Press. ISBN 978-0-521-54885-4.
- Wilmshurst, David (2000). The Ecclesiastical Organisation of the Church of the East, 1318–1913. Louvain: Peeters Publishers. ISBN 978-90-429-0876-5.
