= Muthupandal Festival =

Hindu festival celebrated in Patteeswaram, Tamil Nadu

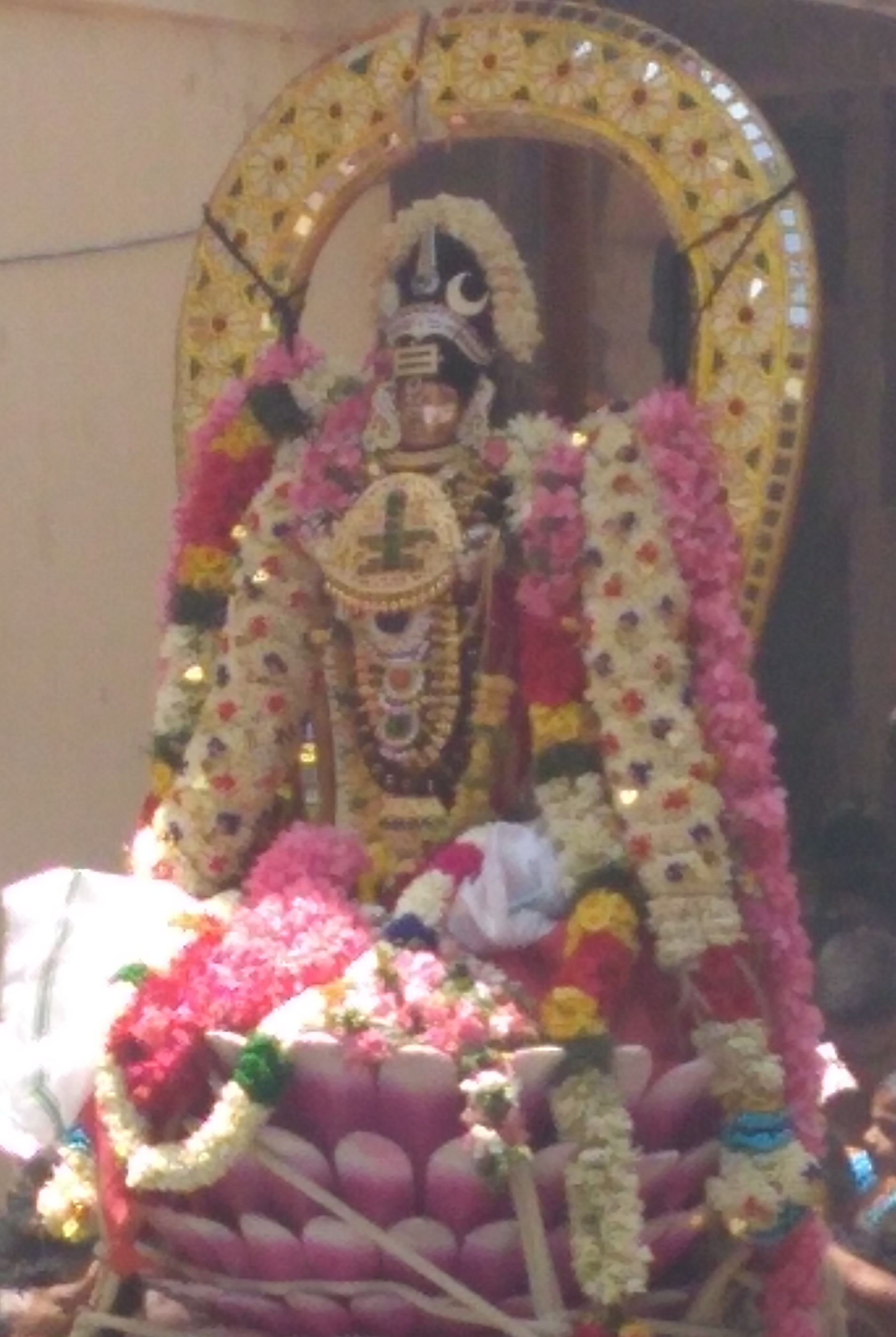
Gnanasambandar

Muthupandal Festival, is a festival celebrated in Thenupuriswarar Temple, in Patteeswaram, Thanjavur district, Tamil Nadu, India.

== Three-day Festival ==
Every year this festival is celebrated. On the first day the festival starts with offering of milk to Sambandar followed by the procession on the mount rishaba. On the second day, after offering of Muthukondai (head dress of pearls), Muthukkudai, and other pearl symbols the procession moves on. On the same day on the Gnanasambandar goes on procession on boat. On the final day, the third day, he appears in Muthupandal (ceiling made of pearl) offered by the Lord, and alongwith his adiyars worship the presiding deity of the temple.

== Offering of Muthupandal ==
During the Vaikasi Brahmotsavam, the important festival of offering of Muthupandal to Gnanasambandar by Lord Shiva and welcoming him takes place. Shiva knews that Gnanasambandar is coming to offer worship alongwith his adiyars. The time was noon. Due to peak of summer oppressive heat waves impact. Gnanasambandar gets tired. Realising this, Shiva sends his bhoodaganas(servants) to decorate the streets with beautiful Muthu pandal (ceiling made of Pearl). They prepares the pandal (ceiling) without Sambandar’s knowledge. He is astonished by the reverence of God and enjoys the shade offered. In order that Sambandar has a view of the sanctum sanctorum from outside, Shiva orders Nandi to shift position. This is the speciality of the shrine. During the festival, Gnanasambandar comes out from the Mutt and goes to Tirumetrazhigai on his palanquin. From there he goes to Sakthivanesvara Temple and goes to Patteeswaram and worships the presiding deity.

== 13 June 2018 Muthupandal festival ==
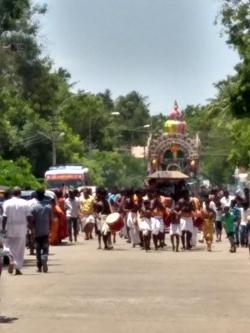
Gnanasambandar comes in front of Thenupuriswarar Temple, Patteeswaram on the palanquin

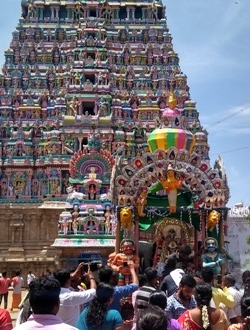
Reaches the temple

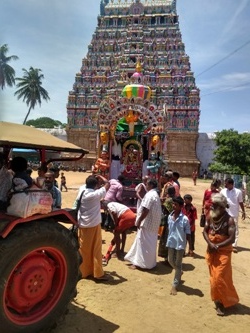
On the palanquin

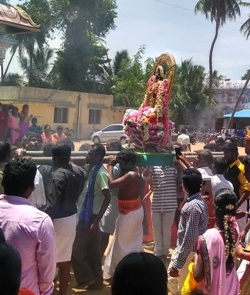
Going to worship the presiding deity

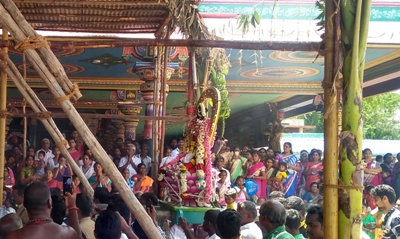
Reaching the shrine

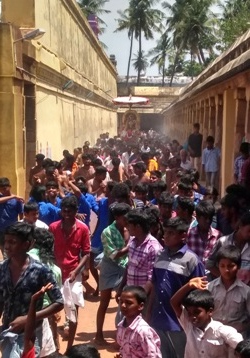
Circumambulates in the prakaram

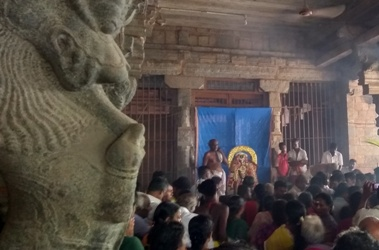
After worshipping Shiva, found in front mandapa and blesses
