= Johannes P. M. van der Ploeg =

Dutch professor (1909-2004)

Johannes Petrus Maria "Jan" van der Ploeg (4 July 1909, in Nijmegen – 4 August 2004, in Nijmegen) was a Dutch Dominican specialist in Hebrew, the Dead Sea Scrolls, and Syriac manuscript research. He was Professor of Old Testament and Semitic studies at the Catholic University of Nijmegen from 1951 to 1979, after which time he spent most of his time in Kerala. He was raised to the dignity of chorbishop (or chorepiscopus) in the Syriac Catholic Church in 1963.

In 1958 he became a member of the Royal Netherlands Academy of Arts and Sciences.

== Selected publications ==
- Oud-Syrisch Monniksleven, Leiden, 1942.
- Vondsten in de Woestijn van Juda, 1957; Engl. transl.: The Excavations at Qumran: A Survey of the Judaean Brotherhood and its Ideas, 1958; German transl., 1959.
- Editio princeps, Aramaic Job Targum from Qumran, 1971.
- The Christians of St. Thomas and their Syriac Manuscripts (Placid Lecture Series, 3), Bangalore, 1983.
- The Book of Judith (Daughter of Merari), (Môrân 'Ethô Series3, Baker Hill, Kottayam, 1991.
