= Muthukkuda =

Muthukkuda or "royal umbrellas" are highly decorative silk parasols used in South India on festive and formal occasions, the privilege of bearing which was formerly controlled by royal authority. Their use is particularly marked in religious festivities in Kerala.
