= Anthony Mathias Mundadan =

- Born: November 12, 1923
- Died: August 31, 2012 (aged 88)
- Occupation: Priest

A. Mathias Mundadan, C.M.I. of Alangad (12 November 1923 - 31 August 2012) was a priest of the Carmelites of Mary Immaculate in the Syro-Malabar Church.

== Biography ==
He was born on 12 November 1923 and died on 31 August 2012. He was appointed Rector of Dharmaram Vidya Kshetram on 22 April 1975 and continued until 1981. He was also a historian of the Church and has authored a number of books.
