= Stephen Neill =

British Anglican bishop (1900–1984)

Stephen Charles Neill (31 December 1900 – 20 July 1984) was a British Anglican bishop, missionary and scholar. He was proficient in a number of languages, including Ancient Greek, Latin and Tamil. He went to Trinity College, Cambridge, and was a fellow there before going as a missionary in Tamil Nadu in British India. He became bishop of Tirunelveli in 1939. He believed in unification of all churches in South India and communion beyond denominations. He wrote several books on theology and church history. He wrote various works including his unfinished History of Christianity as well as Out of bondage; Christ and the Indian villager published in 1930.

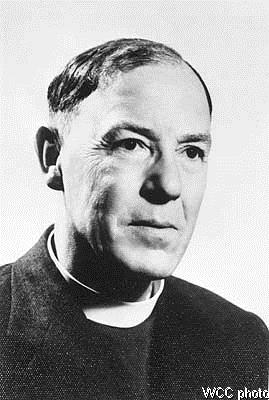
Stephen Charles Neill when he was work for the World Council of Churches (WCC) between 1947 to 1954.

== Early life ==
Neill was born in Edinburgh, Scotland, on 31 December 1900 to Charles Neill and Margaret Penelope ("Daisy") Neill, the daughter of James Monro (for a time Commissioner (CID) at Scotland Yard who, having resigned at the age of 52 on disagreeing with the government, returned to India, where he had been a district officer, to establish a medical mission). Both his parents were missionary doctors in India but spent much of their adult lives in various European countries for reasons of health and for the sake of their children's education. He had two sisters, Marjorie Penelope (1898) and Isabel Ruth (1906), and three brothers: Christopher Henry (1899), Gerald Munro (1902), Eric James (1904).

He was educated at Dean Close School, then in 1918 won a scholarship to Trinity College, Cambridge and was elected to a fellowship in 1924. While still in Cambridge he passed the Church of England's General Ordination Examination which qualified him for ordination but he had decided to go out to India as a layman.

== Ministry in India ==
In 1925 he moved to Dohnavur with his parents. While at Dohnavur he learnt Tamil and was involved in teaching schoolboys. Neill joined the Church Missionary Society (CMS) in 1928 and was ordained a priest. After his ordination he moved to Tirunelvely and later led Thomas Ragland's North Tirunelveli Itineracy evangelism program. He taught Tamil in the CMS theological college in Palayamkottai where he served as its first Principal. There he became involved in negotiations for uniting the churches in South India for the formation of Church of South India. He believed that all churches should unite and no church should be left out as not being in communion. He was elected the bishop at Tirunelveli in 1939. There he held the diocese together during the troubled times of the war, resisting encroachments by the state and initiating development projects in publishing, banking among other areas. In 1944 he resigned. In his autobiography, he attributes this to problems of ill health which had dogged him for most of his life. The editor of the biography notes that in the Diocese the common view is that he had to leave because of instances when he had struck his clergy and he adds that more serious allegations were made.

== Academic work after returning to Europe ==
After his return from India he became the assistant bishop to the Archbishop of Canterbury. Neill worked for the World Council of Churches from 1947 to 1954. In 1962 he went to the University of Hamburg as a professor of missions until 1967 and a professor of philosophy and religious studies in Nairobi between 1969 and 1973. On returning to England, he was offered accommodation by the then Principal of Wycliffe Hall, Oxford which for the rest of his life served as a base between lecturing commitments in various parts of the world and for reading and writing.

== Writings ==
- Neill edited History of Ecumenical Movement 1517-1948 with Ruth Rouse; the World Christian Series and co-edited Concise Dictionary of the Christian World Mission (1971).
- The Interpretation of the New Testament 1891 - 1961, Bhakti, Hindu and Christian and Christian Faith and Other Faiths.
- A History of Christian Missions (1964) published by Penguin Books.
- His magnum opus History of Christianity in India remained uncompleted at the time of his death but the first volume, up to 1707, was published by the Cambridge University Press in 1984. He could achieve this task since he suffered from insomnia which kept him awake most of the night allowing him to write more.
