= List of Syro-Malabar Catholics =

Notable Syro-Malabar Catholics include:

== Religious and spiritual ==
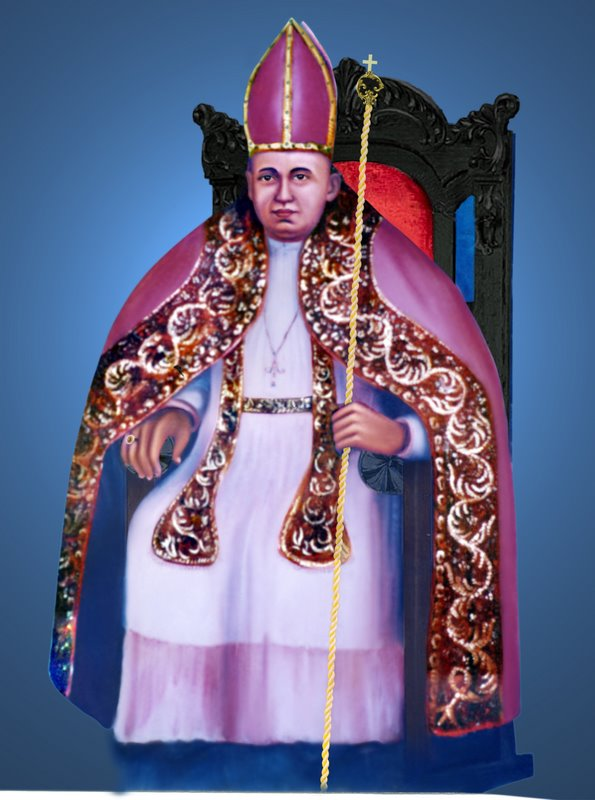
Parambil Mar Chandy

- Parambil Chandy Malpan (Malpan 1663–87)
- Joseph Kariattil (Appointed in 1782)
- Paremmakkal Thoma Kathanar (Appointed in 1786)
- Abraham Pandari (Poulose) (Appointed in 1798)
- Palackal Thoma Malpan (1780–1841)
- Kuriakose Elias Chavara (1805–71)
- Nidhiry Mani Kathanar (1842–1904)
- Aloysius Pazheparambil (1847–1919)
- Thomas Kurialachery (1873–1925)
- Augustine Kandathil (1874–1956), first head of the Syro-Malabar Church after the restoration of hierarchy

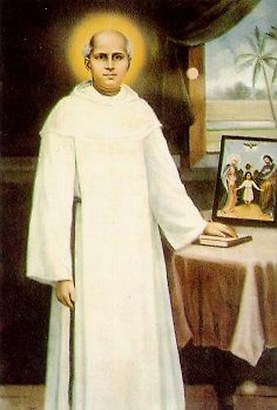
Kuriakose Elias Chavara

- Varghese Payyappilly Palakkappilly (1876–1929)
- Joseph C. Panjikaran (1888-1949)
- Thevarparampil Kunjachan (Kunjachan) (1891–1973)
- Alphonsa of India (1910–46)
- Euphrasia Eluvathingal (1877-1952)
- Joseph Parecattil (1912–87)
- Abel Periyappuram (1920–2001), monk, journalist, and lyricist, and the founder of Kalabhavan
- Antony Padiyara (1921–2000)
- Varkey Vithayathil (1927–2011)
- Abraham Kattumana (1944–1995)
- Mathew Kavukattu (1904-1969)
- Rani Maria Vattalil (1954 - 1995)

== Public service ==
- Thoma of Villarvattom (c. 15th century CE): The only Christian King in the history of the Indian sub-continent.
- Thachil Matthoo Tharakan
- C. J. Varkey, Chunkath, Minister of Madras Presidency (1939).
- A. J. John, Anaparambil (1893–1957), Chief Minister of Travancore-Cochin (1951–53) and Governor of Madras.
- P. T. Chacko, Pullolil, Member of Indian Constituent Assembly from Travancore (1949–50), and Home Minister of Kerala (1960–64).
- M. V. Pylee, Padmabhushan Awardee, former vice-chancellor CUSAT, also known as father of management education in Kerala.
- K. K. Mathew, former supreme court judge

== Literature and film industry ==
Mar Emmanuel Nidhiri

- Paremmakkal Thoma Kathanar - Author of the first travelogue in an Indian language (1778)
- P. C. Devassia, author, literary translator poet, and composer of Christian poetry in Sanskrit
- Mathew Ulakamthara, author of epic Christu Gadha and recipient of Sabha Rathnam, the highest honor of the Syro-Malabar Church.
- George Menachery, a scholar, historian and Papal Dignitary.
- Pius Malekandathil, a historian, author and scholar
- Santhosh George Kulangara - entrepreneur and explorer
- Asin Thottumkal- Former Indian actress.
