= Timeline of the Syro-Malabar Church =

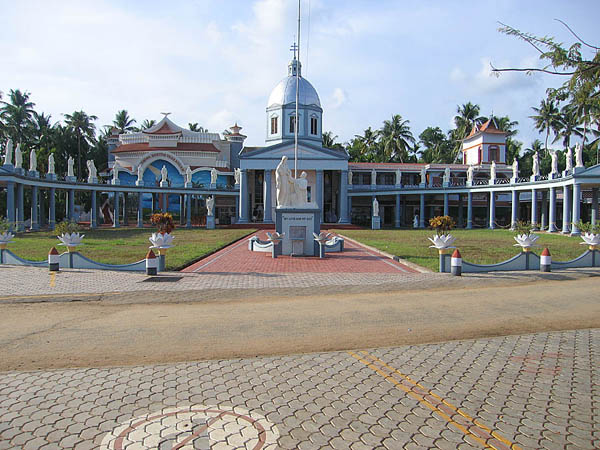
Mar Thoma Pontifical Pilgrim Church, Kodungalloor where the relics of the right hand of the apostle is kept and venerated. This new church is built where it is believed that the first of the seven churches was built by St. Thomas in AD 50.

This is a timeline of the history of the Syro-Malabar Catholic Church in India.

== Ancient era ==
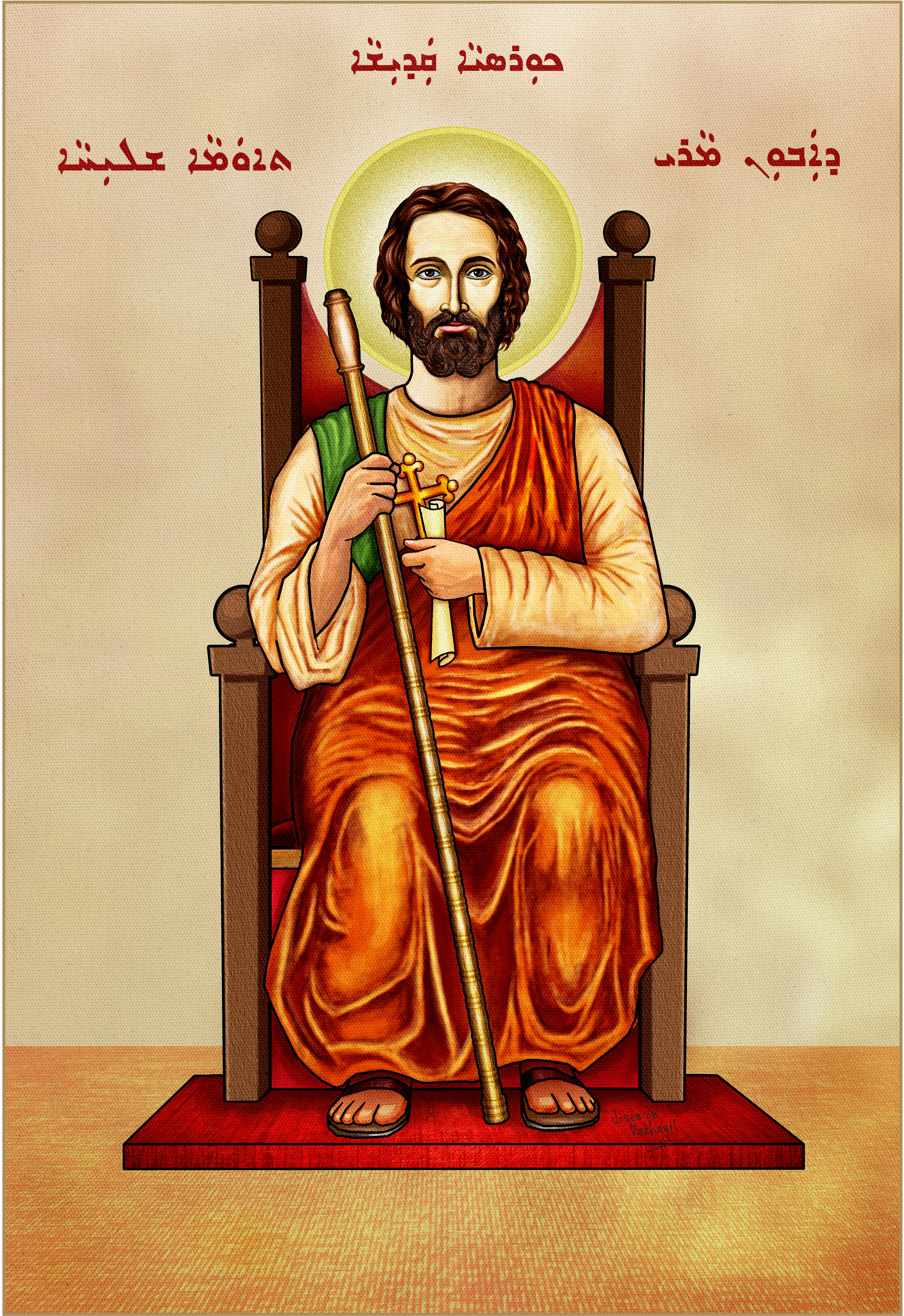
Icon of Throne of Mar Thoma Sleeha November 21 : The Feast of the Arrival of Mar Thoma Sleeha in India and The Feast of the Throne of the Mar Thoma Sleeha

- 849 – Ayyanadikal Kurakoni (Iyenadikal Thiruvadikal), King of Venad, granted special privileges to Christians of Kollam
- 892 – Tharisapalli plates
- 1291 – arrival of John of Montecorvino, a member of Societas Peregrinantium Pro Christo, in Kollam
- 1292 – arrival of Venetian traveller Marco Polo in India; he later testified about Christian presence
- 1301 – Mar Jacob (Mar Yaqob of India), 1301 AD) was one of the legendary metropolitan of the Church of Malabar of St Thomas Christians
- 1323 – arrival of French Dominican friar Jordanus Catalani de Severac in Kollam (Quilon)
- 1324 – Jordanus Catalani de Severac wrote Mirabilia Descripta, a rare work on plants, animals and the people of India and of other countries in Asia
- 9 August 1329 – Pope John XXII (in captivity in Avignon) erected Quilon as the first Diocese in the whole of Indies as suffragan to the Archdiocese of Sultany in Persia through the decree Romanus Pontifix
- 21 August 1329 – Pope John XXII by the bull Venerabili Fratri Jordano, appointed the French Dominican friar Jordanus Catalani de Severac as the first Bishop of Quilon
- 23 March 1346 – arrival of John De Marignolli, Legate to China, in Quilon
- 1490 – Two bishops, Mar Yohannan and Mar Thoma, served in India, sent there by the Patriarch of the Church of the East.

== Portuguese era ==
- 20 May 1498 – arrival of Vasco da Gama
- 1504 – Bishop Mar Yacob (Kodungalloor)
- 6 June 1542 – preaching by Francis Xavier
- 1555 – Bishop Mar Joseph took charge
- 4 February 1557 – Pope Paul IV established, by his Bull "Pro Excellento Praeeminentia", Diocese of Cochin
- 1564 – Mar Abraham appointed Archbishop of Angamaly (Pope Pius IV)
- 29 August 1567 – establishment of Archdiocese of Angamaly as Metropolitan see
- 1597 – death of Mar Abraham, the last Syrian archbishop; burial at the Church of St. Hormice, Angamaly
- 20 June – 26 June 1599 – Synod of Diamper
- 5 November 1599 – Francis Ros nominated first Latin Bishop of Syrians
- 4 August 1600 – extension of the Rule of Padroado on Syrians
- 7 December 1603 – Angamaly Synod
- 3 December 1609 – seat of the Archdiocese of Angamaly moved to Kodungalloor

== Era of divisions ==
A diagram showing the history of the divisions among the Saint Thomas Christians.

- 22 December 1610 – Archbishop Menezes of Goa restricted the jurisdiction of the Metropolitan of St. Thomas Christians from the north of Malabar to the south
- December 1647 – Archbishop Garcia appointed Fr. Jerome Furtado as Vicar General in place of the traditional Archdeacon
- 1652 – Mar Ahatalla met deacons Chenkayil Itty of Chengannur and Kizhakkedath Kurian of Kuravilangad at Mylapore and sent message to the Archdeacon
- 3 January 1653 – Archdeacon and others with 25,000 soldiers went to Cochin Port to receive Mar Ahatalla; but the Portuguese did not permit Mar Ahatalla to meet the people; rumour spreads that Ahatalla was murdered by the Portuguese
- 3 January 1653 – Archdeacon Parambil Thoma and the elders take the oath Coonan Cross Oath at Mattancherry that they will no longer be under the Portuguese Jesuits
- 22 May 1653 – Episcopal ordination of Thomas the Archdeacon at Alangad by 12 priests of St. Thomas Christians
- 1659 – death of Archbishop Garcia SJ
- 3 December 1659 – Vicariate Apostolic of Malabar (Verapoly) erected by Pope Alexander VII
- 15 December 1659 – Episcopal Ordination of Italian Sebastiani OCD
- 17 December 1659 – Bishop Sebastiani OCD took charge as Administrator of Malabar
- 24 December 1659 – Bishop Sebastiani given power to ordain a Bishop in Malabar by Pope Alexander VII through the Apostolic Letter Pro Commissa Nobis
- 7 January 1662 – The conquest of Portuguese territories in Malabar and especially of Cochin by the Dutch and all the Catholic Missionaries including Bishop Sebastiani OCD were expelled from the territories occupied by the Dutch
- 31 January 1663 – Alexander Palliveettil (Parambil Chandy, Alexander de Campo) appointed the first Syrian Vicar Apostolic of Malabar
- 1665–1671 – Spread of Jacobite faith by Mar Gregorios of Jerusalem in Malabar
- 1 February 1663 Palliveetil mar Chandy consecrated as Metropolitan and gate of all India.
- 2 January 1687 – Death of Bishop Alexander Palliveettil (Parambil Chandy Malpan, Bishop Alexander de Campo)
- 29 June 1704 – John Ribeiro S. J. appointed Archbishop of Kodungalloor (Padroado)
- 13 March 1709 – Suppression of Vicariate Apostolic of Malabar and Vicariate Apostolic of Verapoly erected by Pope Clement XI
- 1773 February 8 – Martyrdom of Fr. Jacob (Ikako) Puthenpurackal
- 16 July 1782 – Mar Joseph Kariyatty appointed Archbishop of Kodungalloor by Padroado
- 16 December 1782 – Rome approves Mar Joseph Kariyatty as Archbishop of Kodungalloor
- 17 February 1783 – Episcopal ordination of Mar Joseph Kariyatty at Lisbon, Porgugal
- 10 September 1786 – Death of Archbishop Kariyatty in Goa; Paremmakkal Thoma Kathanar appointed Gubernador (Administrator) of the Archdiocese of Kodungalloor
- 1 February 1787 – Angamaly Padiyola

== Era of invasions ==
- December 1790 - Invasion of Mysore ruler Tipu Sultan on Kingdom of Cochin. Ancient Syrian churches at Palayur, Arthat, Ollur, Parappukkara, Velayanad (Mukundapuram), Ambazhakad, Thazhekad, Angamaly, Akaparamb etc. were destroyed by the Mysore army. The Syrian seminary and nasrani church headquarters at Angamaly were devastated.
- The headquarters of the church moved first to Alengad and then to Vadayar in Travancore.
- Many priests and laymen were martyred for faith and hundreds of Nasranis migrated to Travancore to protect their faith.
- 20 March 1799 – Death of Paremmakkal Thoma Kathanar
- 10 February 1805 – Birth of Kuriakose Elias Chavara at Kainakary, Alappuzha
- 1818 – Arrival of the CMS missionaries
- 11 May 1831 – Foundation of the first indigenous religious congregation (CMI) at Mannanam by Frs. Thomas Palackal, Thomas Porookara and Kuriakose Elias Chavara
- 1833 – Establishment of the Seminary at Mannanam
- 24 April 1838 – The final Latin invasion on the Indian Syrian church - the Metropolitan See of Kodungallur (Angamaly for Syrians) and the See of Cochin were suppressed and territory was added to Vicariate Apostolic of Verapoly by the Brief "Multa Praeclara" of Pope Gregory XVI
- 1861- The arrival of chaldean bishop Thomas mar Rocos
- 8 June 1861 – Fr. Kuriakos Elias Chavara appointed Vicar General for Syrians
- 13 February 1866 – Foundation of the first indigenous religious congregation for women (CMC) at Koonammavu
- 13 August 1866 – Establishment of Seminary at Puthenpally
- 1866 – Purchase of land in the name of Parayil Varky Tharakan at Mangalappuzha near Aluva
- 3 January 1871 – Death of Kuriakose Elias Chavara
- 1 August 1874 – Chaldean bishop Mar Elia Melus arrived in Kerala
- 25 October 1874 – Mar Melus excommunicated by Rome. Origin of Suryis of Thrisur (Assyrian Church of the East)
- 26 April 1876 – Birth of Sr. Mariam Thressia at Puthenchira, Thrisur
- 12 October 1877 – Episcopal ordination of Bishop Marcellinus OCD
- 17 October 1877 – Birth of Sr. Euphrasia (Rose) at Kattur, in the parish Edathuruthy, Thrisur
- 15 November 1877 – Bishop Marcellinus OCD made ruler of the Syrians
- 19 March 1878 – Bishop Marcellinus OCD commenced his reign
- 23 June 1886 – See of Cochin (for Latin Catholics) restored by Pope Leo XIII
- 1 September 1886 – Establishment of the Latin Hierarchy in India by Pope Leo XIII by the decree Humanae Salutis Auctor; Vicariate Apostolic of Verapoly elevated to Archdiocese of Verapoly

== Era of self-governance ==
- 20 May 1887 – two independent Vicariates of Kottayam (present Changanassery ^{1}) and Thrissur ^{2} for Syrians; Charles Lavigne and Adolf Medlycott were made Vicar Apostolic respectively (Quod Jampridem, Pope Leo XIII)
- 14 December 1888 – foundation of Franciscan Clarist Congregation (FCC) at Changanassery.
- 25 March 1889 - Under Thrissur Vicariate, establishment of one of first catholic schools in princely state of Cochin, St Thomas Lower Secondary School in Thrissur by Mar Adolf Medleycott.
- 16 September 1890 – seat of Kottayam Vicariate moved to Changanassery.
- 26 January 1891 - Under Kottayam Vicariate, Establishment of one of the oldest residential catholic schools in central Travancore, St. Berchmans English High School in Changanassery by Mar Charles Lavigne.
- 1 April 1891 – birth of Augustine Thevarparampil (Kunjachan) at Ramapuram, Kottayam
- 24 June 1892 – foundation of Sisters of the Visitation of the Blessed Virgin Mary (SVM) at Kaipuzha, Kottayam
- 28 July 1896 – Vicariate of Ernakulam^{3} created, with territories from both Vicariates of Changanassery and Thrissur and Mar Aloysius Pazheparambil, Mar Mathew Makkil, and Mar John Menachery were made the bishops respectively (Quae Rei Sacrae, Pope Leo XIII).
- 8 December 1908 – foundation of Sisters of Adoration of the Blessed Sacrament (SABS) at Champakulam, Changanassery
- 19 August 1910 – Birth of Sr. Alphonsa Muttathupadth FCC at Kudamaloor, Kottayam.
- 1 January 1911 – foundation of Sacred Heart Congregation for Women (Kerala) (SH) at Palai
- 29 August 1911 – establishment of Kottayam^{4} Vicariate for the Knanaya (Southists) Community of the Syrians
- 14 May 1914 – foundation of the Congregation of Holy Family (CHF) at Puthenchira, Thrisur by Mariam Thressia
- 8 August 1918 - Raised St. Thomas Lower Secondary School to St. Thomas College, Thrissur.
- 29 January 1921 – foundation of Eparchial Society of the Oblates of the Sacred Heart (OSH)
- 22 June 1922 - Establishment of SB College Changanassery by Mar Thomas Kurialacherry in compound of St. Mary's Church, Parel.

== Metropolitan Archbishop, title restoration ==
- 21 December 1923 – establishment of the Syro-Malabar Hierarchy with Ernakulam as the Metropolitan See and Mar Augustine Kandathil as the first Head and Archbishop of the Church (Romani Pontifices, Pope Pius XI)
- 16 November 1924 – Mar Augustine Kandathil installed as Archbishop
- 19 March 1927 – foundation of the Sisters of the Destitute (SD) at Chunungumvely, Ernakulam by Varghese Payyappilly Palakkappilly
- 19 July 1927 – foundation of the Vincentian Congregation (VC)
- 3 July 1928 – foundation of Sisters of St Joseph Congregation (SJC) at Kottayam
- 5 October 1929 – death of Mar Varghese Payyappilly Palakkappilly
- 19 March 1931 – foundation of the Congregation of Saint Thérèse of Lisieux (CST) by Mar Augustine Kandathil as a religious brothers congregation, the first such in India
- 1 June 1932 – establishment of Mangalapuzha Seminary
- 7 May 1933 – foundation of the Missionary Congregation for the Blessed Sacrament (MCBS)
- 1 January 1944 – foundation of Congregation of Sisters of Charity (CSC) at Chollannoor, Thrisur
- 31 October 1944 – foundation of Medical Sisters of St Joseph (MSJ) at Kothamangalam
- 27 December 1945 – Fr. Thomas Panatt (Fr. Basilius CST) founds the priestly wing of the Congregation of Saint Thérèse of Lisieux (CST) to better realise its aims
- 28 July 1946 – death of Sr. Alphonsa Muttathupadath FCC at Bharanaganam
- 19 March 1948 – foundation of Congregation of the Sisters of Nazareth (CSN) at Edakkunnu, Ernakulam
- 20 April 1948 – foundation of Congregation of the Sisters of St. Martha (CSM) at Ponnookara, Thrisur
- 2 April 1949 – foundation of Assisi Sisters of Mary Immaculate (ASMI) at Cherthala, Alappuzha by Mgr. Joseph K. W. Thomas
- 25 July 1950 – eparchy of Palai^{5}
- 29 August 1952 – death of Sr. Euphrasia CMC
- 1 December 1953 – official visitation of Cardinal Tisserant of the Oriental Churches in India
- 31 December 1953 – Eparchy of Thalaseri^{6}
- 29 January 1954 – Birth of Sr. Rani Maria FCC at Pulluvazhy, Ernakulam.
- 10 January 1956 – death of Archbishop Mar Augustine Kandathil
- 26 July 1956 – Changanaseri made Archiparchy

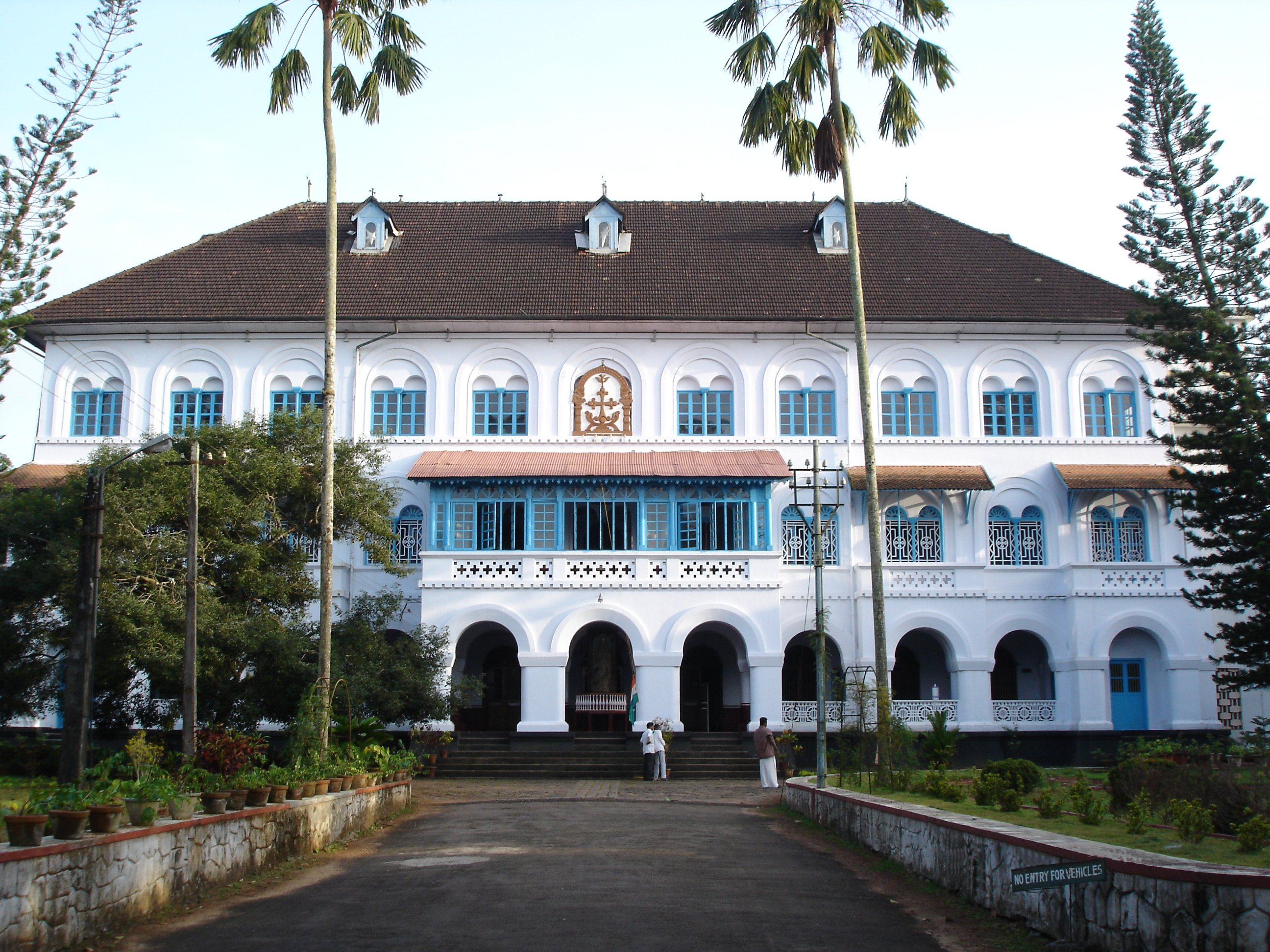
Archbishop's House, Changanassery.

- 10 January 1957 – Eparchy of Kothamangalam^{7}
- 1 June 1957 – establishment of Dharmaram College, a major seminary by the CMI in Bangalore
- 1 January 1958 – Fr. Placid Podipara made Rector of Malabar College in Rome
- 25 January 1961 – foundation of Congregation of Samaritan Sisters (CSS) at Thrisur
- 19 December 1961 – The Portuguese surrendered to Indian army. Portuguese colonies including Goa were liberated and annexed to Indian Union.
- 31 March 1962 – eparchy of Chanda,^{8} Maharashtra (CMI)
- 3 July 1962 – establishment of St. Thomas Apostolic Seminary, Vadavathoor, Kottayam
- 16 May 1968 – foundation of Malabar Missionary Brothers (MMB)
- 16 July 1968 – foundation of the Missionary Society of St Thomas the Apostle (MST)
- 29 July 1968 – eparchy of Sagar,^{9} Madhya Pradesh (CMI)
- 29 July 1968 – eparchy of Satna,^{10} Madhya Pradesh (VC)
- 29 July 1968 – eparchy of Ujjain,^{11} Madhya Pradesh (MST)
- 3 July 1969 – foundation of Missionary Congregation of the Daughters of St. Thomas (DST) at Aruvithura, Kottayam by Rev. Fr. T.C. Jacob (Thazhathel family)
- 23 March 1972 – eparchy of Bijnor,^{12} Uttarakhand (CMI)
- 23 March 1972 – eparchy of Jagdalpur,^{13} Chattisgargh (CMI)
- 1 March 1973 – eparchy of Mananthavady^{14}
- 16 October 1973 – death of Fr. Augustine Thevarparampil (Kunjachan)
- 20 March 1974 – St Mary's Basilica, Ernakulam- first basilica in Syro Malabar church was designated.
- 20 June 1974 – eparchy of Palakkad^{15}
- 25 February 1977 – eparchy of Rajkot^{16} (CMI)
- 26 February 1977 – eparchy of Kanjirappally^{17}
- 19 May 1977 – foundation of Society of Kristu Dasis (SKD) at Mananthavady by Bishop Jacob Thoomkuzhy
- 22 June 1978 – eparchy of Irinjalakkuda^{18}
- 26 August 1978 – Cardinal Joseph Parekkattil attended Conclave – first of its kind from Syro-Malabar Rite
- 8 September 1978 – Mar Antony Padiyara appointed Apostolic Visitor of Non-resident Keralite Syro-Malabarians by Pope John Paul I
- 19 June 1984 – eparchy of Gorakhpur,^{19} Uttar Pradesh (CST)
- 27 April 1985 – death of Father Placid J Podipara
- 19 December 1985 – approval of the Text of the Order of Syro-Malabar Qurbana by the Sacred Congregation for Oriental Churches
- 8 February 1986 – inauguration of the Order of Syro-Malabar Qurbana by Pope John Paul II at Kottayam
- 8 February 1986 – Beatification of Fr. Kuriakose Elias Chavara CMI and Sr. Alphonsa Muttathupadathu FCC at Kottayam by Pope John Paul II – first man and woman from India to the Altar
- 28 April 1986 – eparchy of Thamaraseri^{20}
- 30 April 1988 – eparchy of Kalyan,^{21} Maharashtra
- 3 July 1989 – establishment of the Renovated Syro-Malabar Qurbana by the Sacred Congregation for Oriental Churches
- 3 July 1989 – foundation of Sisters of St. Thomas (SST) at Managanam, Kottayam
- 25 April 1992 – Our Lady of Dolours Basilica, Thrissur designated.

== A major archiepiscopal church ==
- 16 December 1992 – establishment of Major Archiepiscopal see of Ernakulam-Angamaly
- 29 January 1993 – Cardinal Antony Padiyara, the first Major Archbishop (Quae Majori Christifidelium, Pope John Paul II), and Mar Abraham Kattumana, made Pontifical Delegate
- 20 May 1993 – Cardinal Padiyara takes charge. First Synod of the Church
- 25 February 1995 – Sr. Rani Maria FCC martyred at Indore, Madhya Pradesh
- 18 May 1995 – eparchies of Thrissur and Thalasseri made Archeparchies
- 18 December 1996 – Cardinal Padiyara's resignation accepted. Archbishop Mar Varkey Vithayathil CSSR, Apostolic Administrator of Ernakulam–Angamaly
- 11 November 1996 – Eparchy of Thuckalay,^{22} (Kanyakumari) Tamil Nadu
- 28 October 1997 – foundation of Mar Thoma Sleeha Monastery (MTSM) at Nallathanni, Kottayam
- 3 February 1998 – Major Archiepiscopal Headquarters at Mount St. Thomas, Kakkanad
- 9 November 1998 – First Major Archiepiscopal Assembly
- 24 April 1999 – Eparchy of Belthangady,^{23} (Mangaloru), Karnataka
- 23 July 1999 – Eparchy of Adilabad,^{24} Telangana (CMI)
- 9 April 2000 – Beatification of Sr. Mariam Thressia CHF in Vatican by Pope John Paul II
- 6 July 2001 – Eparchy of St. Thomas of Chicago,^{25} United States
- 19 December 2002 – Eparchy of Idukki^{26}
- 9 May 2005 – Eparchy of Kottayam made Archieparchy
- 30 April 2006 – Beatification of Fr. Augustine Theavarparampil (Kunjachan) at Ramapuram, Palai by Major Archbishop Varkey Vithayathil
- 3 December 2006 – Beatification of Sr. Euphrasia CMC at Ollur, Thrissur by Major Archbishop Cardinal Varkey Vithayathil
- 21 August 2007 – Eparchy of Bhadravathi,^{27} Karnataka (MCBS)
- 22 July 2008 – Christ University – the first University by the Catholic Church in India, established by the CMIs in Bangalore
- 12 October 2008 – Canonization of Sr. Alphonsa (Anna) Muttathupadath FCC in Vatican by Pope Benedict XVI – the first woman Saint from India
- 6 November 2008 – visit of Cardinal Leonardo Sandri, Prefect of the Congregation for the Oriental Churches; he visited many eparchies in Kerala and paid respects to St. Alphonsa at her tomb at Bharananganam
- 24 June 2009 – Pope Benedict XVI declares the St. George Churuch at Angamaly a minor Basilica
- 6 August 2009 – Major Archbishop promulgates the Order of Celebrations on Nativity of Our Lord, Ash Day, Osana Sunday, Thursday of Pesha, Friday of Passion, Great Saturday and Great Sunday of Resurrection
- 14 August 2009 – Fr. John Vadakkel CMI, appointed bishop of the Eparchy of Bijnor
- 23 August 2009 – Union Government of India issued coins in honour of St. Alphonsa
- 6 September 2009 – Mar Varghese Payyappilly Palakkappilly declared Servant of God
- 18 January 2010 – Eparchies of Mandya,^{28} (Mysoru), Karnataka and Ramanathapuram,^{29} (Coimbatore), Tamil Nadu
- 24 May 2011 – Mar George Alencherry elected as the third Major Archbishop
- 6 March 2012 – Eparchy of Faridabad (Delhi) erected for Indian states of Haryana, Punjab, Himachal Pradesh, Jammu & Kashmir, parts of Uttar Pradesh and national capital territory of Delhi.
- 11 January 2014 – Eparchy at Melbourne, Australia erected.
- 23 November 2014 – Canonisation of Blessed Chavara and Blessed Euphrasia
- 6 August 2015 – Apostolic exarchate at Mississauga, Canada.
- 26 August 2015 – Extension of the territory of eparchy of Mandya to Bangalore and certain other parts of Karnataka.
- 28 July 2016 – Erection of eparchy of Great Britain for England, Scotland and Wales.
- 27 November 2016 – Kalloorkad St Mary's church, Champakulam was designated as basilica.
- 10 October 2017 – All India jurisdiction of Syro-Malabar church was restored by Pope Francis.
  - 2 New eparchies were erected.
    - Eparchy of Hosur (Mylapore) erected for parts of Tamil Nadu and Pondicherry.
    - Eparchy of Shamshabad (Hyderabad) erected for Indian states of Goa, Andhra Pradesh, Odisha, Jharkhand, Bihar, West Bengal, Rajasthan, North Eastern states, parts of 8 other states and 4 union territories of India (including 2 island groups).
  - Extension of the territories of two eparchies: Ramanathapuram (Coimbatore) and Thuckalay (Kanyakumari).
- 4 November 2017 – Beatification of first woman martyr of Syro Malabar church, Sr. Rani Maria in Indore (Madhya Pradesh)
- Eparchy of Mississauga, Canada
- Canonization of Saint Mariam Thresia
- 1 April 2021 – Bishop Mar Joseph Kallarangatt of Palai renewed Holy Leaven (Malka) for liturgical use - first time a bishop renewed Holy Leaven after the Synod of Diamper had banned its use.

Rite of Renewal of Holy Leaven (Malka) by Mar Joseph Kallarangatt

== See also ==
- Christianity in India
- Timeline of Indian history
- Timeline of the Catholic Church

== Sources ==
- Koonammakkal, Thomas (2013). Peter Bruns; Heinz Otto Luthe (eds.). "Syro-Malabar History and Traditions". Orientalia Christiana: Festschrift für Hubert Kaufhold zum 70. Geburtstag; pp. 259-276. Wiesbaden: Harrassowitz Verlag: 273–278. ISBN 9783447068857.
