= Angamaly Padiyola =

Angamāly Padiyōla
- Created: 1 February 1787; 239 years ago
- Location: Angamāly
- Authors: Paremmakkal Thoma Kathanar; Thachil Matthoo Tharakan; Priests and lay representatives from 84 Paḻayakūṟ churches of the Malankara Church
- Purpose: Declaration of ecclesiastical independence from Latin Catholic hegemony

Angamāly Padiyōla is a historic declaration of the Syrian Catholic/ Syro Malabar (Paḻayakūṟ) Saint Thomas Christians proclaimed in 1787 at the Great Church of Saint George in Angamāly. This document made a strong appeal to the pope for the consecration of a native bishop for the community and demanded autonomy for their Church which was forcibly brought under the Latin Church's jurisdiction.

== Background ==
The Saint Thomas Christian community was previously in communion with the Church of the East and subject to the ecclesiastical jurisdiction of the Patriarch of Babylon until the death of Metropolitan Abraham. Following the death of the Metropolitan, the Portuguese colonialist Latin missionaries succeeded in organising the Synod of Diamper of 1599, which initiated the forcible latinisation and subjugation of the ancient native Indian Christian community. The oppressive Padroado hierarchy witnessed a turbulent reaction from them in 1653, in the form of the Coonan Cross Oath. In order to pacify the situation and to reunite the revolting Christians, the Pope sent Propaganda Carmelite missionaries. However, the unilateral and arrogant approach of the Carmelites led to the eventual division of the community into Paḻayakūṟ and Pùttènkūṟ factions.

The Pùttènkūṟ, led by Archdeacon Thoma I continued their revolt and gradually adopted the Miaphysitism and West Syriac Rite of the Syriac Orthodox Church, introduced by bishop Gregorios Abdul Jaleel.

Meanwhile, the Paḻayakūṟ, who reunited with the Catholic Church were placed under foreign missionaries yet again after the death of their bishop, Palliveettil Chandy. Often the power disputes between the Propaganda Vicariate of Malabar and the Padroado Archdiocese of Cranganore created crisis and parallel jurisdiction among them. Meanwhile, both groups were alike in their treatment of the Saint Thomas Christian community. They were deprived of their autonomy and the latin ecclesiastical and liturgical hegemony was imposed. Withstanding all these, they remained steadfast to their East Syriac traditions and struggled to maintain their ecclesiastical autonomy.

The late eighteenth century witnessed an attempt for reunification of both factions of the community under bishop Thoma VI, the leader of the Pùttènkūṟ and the only bishop among both factions, who was ready to reunite with the Catholic Church and acknowledge the Pope's authority. Thoma VI was being compelled by the Syriac Orthodox delegates led by Baselios Shakrallah Qasabgi, who came to Kerala in 1751, to establish and to enforce the West Syriac Rite and Syriac Orthodoxy among the Pùttènkūṟ. To materialize the reunification plan, two Paḻayakūṟ priests, Kariyattil Iousep Malpan and Paremmakkal Thoma Kathanar, set their journey to Rome, to meet the Pope and to convey the message of Thoma VI. However, the Propaganda missionaries, who had already achieved the trust of the pope, managed to spoil the efforts at Rome. But, the Portuguese Queen, who was impressed with Kariyattil Iousep for his sincere effort and knowledge, decided to bestow the title of Archbishop of Cranganore upon him using her Padroado rights. Kariyattil Iousep was consecrated as the Archbishop of Cranganore at Lisbon and he received the pallium from the pope. However, the eventual success met with a sudden tragedy at Goa, when Kariyattil Iousep was found dead at the age of forty-nine.

The Saint Thomas Christians believed that his death was a result of treachery of the Goan ecclesiastical authorities, since the latter feared and vehemently opposed a Saint Thomas Christian becoming a bishop for his own community. Paremmakkal Thoma soon took charge as the administrator of the Archdiocese of Cranganore. The Angamāly Padiyōla is a charter signed and inscribed by Saint Thomas Christian leaders from 84 Paḻayakūṟ churches led by Paremmakkal Thoma and gathered at the Great Church of Angamāly to discuss and to decide their future plans. The assembly decided to request the pope and the Portuguese monarch to consecrate Paremmakkal Thoma as the bishop for their community. They also decided to return their allegiance to the Chaldean Patriarchate, if their requests are not fulfilled. They selected twelve priests to assist Paremmakkal in his ecclesiastical responsibilities.

== Content ==
The document signed by all the people of the Church of Malankara (beginning with Angamāly) who were assembled in the Great Church of Angamāly, on the first of February in the year of our Lord, 1787, in reference to the multitude of the true faith, and with regard to the bringing about a real union in our Church, and a walk according to the manners and customs of our ancestors.

Our forefathers received the true faith of Jesus Christ at the hands of the Apostle Saint Thomas. Upon this, Chaldean Syrian bishops ruled over us up to the time of the death of the Metropolitan Mar Abraham, which took place in the East Church of Angamāly in the year 1596. Then the Sanpaloor padre [Jesuits priests] stopped the arrival of other Syrians, and oppressed our people, and ruled over them with an iron rule. However, another Syrian Metran [bishop, referring to Ahatalla] arrived at Cochin with the view of coming to us; but soon the news reached us that he had come to an untimely death by being drowned in the sea. Upon this our forefathers assembled at Mattancherry, and took an oath that neither they themselves, nor their descendants, should ever have anything to do with the Sanpaloor padre. They subsequently assembled at Allangād church, where they duly nominated Archdeacon Thoma as their bishop. Not long after, the Carmelites, who were then established at Goa, were brought into the country, and they asserted that the bishop who was elected by this assembly could not bless the anointing oil. They proposed, however, that some one should sent to Rome to be consecrated there, and he might, on his return, complete the consecration of Mar Thoma. This proposal, which was sent through Padre Joseph [Joseph Maria Sebastiani], was agreed to; and upon this Joseph himself went to Rome and received consecration. On his return to Malabar he refused to acknowledge the ordination and the blessings of the anointing oil per formed by the bishop Mar Thoma, and consecrated Chandy Kathanar as bishop over us. Towards the end of Chandy's life the Carmelites formed a plan to extinguish the rank and honour of our Church altogether; they consecrated a half-caste Portuguese, Raphael by name, over the Malabar Churches. Our people, however, insisted that they would not submit to a half-caste bishop. About this time Mar Shemon [Shemon of Ada], a Syrian, was on his way to be our bishop. But the Sanpaloor padre detained him at Tānūr. Some Carmelite priests went thither and took charge of him, promising to banish him from the country. They took him first to the church of Allangād, and after they had brought about the consecration of Padre Angelus [Angelus Francis] they put Mar Shemon on board a ship and took him to Pondicherry, where he was imprisoned, and died a most miserable death. Thus have these two religious orders oppressed our forefathers in various ways. The bishop, Mar Thoma, offered on different occasions not only to give in his submission to the Holy Church, but also to cause others to submit, but up to this time his offer has not been accepted. On the contrary, the above-mentioned two orders trouble our Church and bring dishonour upon her; they seize our priests, and, by confining them closely, cause their death; their servants also maim them in their bodies. If our bishop deposes a priest from his office, then their bishop immediately re-instates him; if our bishop pronounces the Maharon [sentence of excommunication], then theirs absolves! Certain of their priests, when visiting some of our churches, openly and privately transgressed the Seventh Commandment, and committed sundry other crimes. On this account the Heathen look upon us with scorn and contempt. In order to lay all these our grievances before His Holiness the Pope, and the most faithful Queen of Portugal, we unanimously requested our honoured Kariāttil [Iousep Kariattil], Malpan, and Parammakkel Thoma, Kathanar, to visit Rome and Portugal. When they reached those places, they found that our enemies, through letters and by word of mouth, had raised many objections, and a long delay was the consequence. However, through the goodness of Almighty God, his Holiness the Pope and the faithful Queen were moved to grant the petition. The honoured Kariātil Malpan was consecrated as Metropolitan of the Diocese of Malankara. They set out from Rome for Goa; but there the Metropolitan lost his life through treachery.

As nothing but strife and grievance must continue to arise if we have our bishops from a race which oppresses us, we have sent information to Rome and Portugal, to the effect that our Church should have bishops from among its own body, just as other countries and nations have from among themselves; and that our mind is made up that in future we will have no bishop but from among ourselves; and until we obtain such an one, we will only receive ordination and holy oil according to the command of our honourable Governor.

We have chosen Paremmākkel Thoma, kathanar, our present Governor, to be our Metropolitan. Should this application to the faithful Queen of Portugal meet with a refusal, we will transfer our allegiance to the Chaldean Patriarch, Mar Joseph (who himself is subject to the Holy Church), as our forefathers rendered their allegiance before the Portuguese had power over us; and we will procure bishops thence who will consecrate our honourable Governors.

If any obstacle should arise before this plan is carried out, we will not submit to it. All who act contrary to this agreement we shall treat as excommunicated from Church and community. If any churches should act contrary, we will have no intercourse with them.We, the representatives of eighty-four churches in the diocese of Malankara, have honestly signed this document, in the name of the Father, and of the Son, and of the Holy Ghost; and before Saint George the Martyr in the Great Church at Angamāly.

— Angamāly Padiyōla
