= Varthamanappusthakam =

Travelogue written in Malayalam in 1790s

Varthamanappusthakam is a Malayalam travelogue written by Paremmakkal Thoma Kathanar, a Nasrani Mappila kathanar of the modern-day Syro-Malabar Church. It is the first ever travelogue written in an Indian Language. It was written in the 18th century (1790) but then forgotten, being re-discovered in 1935 and first printed in 1936 by Luka Mathai Plathottam at Athirampuzha St Marys Press in the year 1936.

Interactive map of the Varthamanappusthakam journey. Blue: Journey to Rome · Red: Return journey · Green: Reconstructed continuation · Schematic reconstruction by Dr. Jewel Binu · Routes approximate View map data

Varthamanappusthakam postulates that the foundation of Indian nationalism rests on the basic principle that India should achieve civic self-rule. Long before the debates on nationalism shaking the intellectual circles of Europe, Asia, and Africa, Thoma Kathanar offers a distinctive positionality as a minority Syriac Christian priest and subsequent administrator of the Syriac Catholic Archeparchy of Kodungalloor with transnational ties to Portuguese ecclesiology who nevertheless argues in favor of autonomous Indian civic governance. It gives the history of a journey undertaken by the author along with Mar Joseph Kariattil from Malabar Coast (modern day Kerala) to Rome via Lisbon and back. The manuscript of the book is kept at the St Thomas Christian Museum in Kochi.

The history of travelogues in Malayalam is short but exciting and absorbing. The first work in the genre Varthamanappusthakam was written by P. Thoma Kathanar (1736–99) in the latter part of the eighteenth century but its existence was totally forgotten by later generations. It was discovered in 1935 and was printed next year. Sankaran Namboothiri informs that Kathanar accompanied K. Yausep Malpan in his journey from Parur to Rome. They went by foot up to Madras from where they sailed. They took along route via Cape of Good Hope, South America and Lisbon. The voyage lasted nearly eight years." It is-certainly one of the most valuable travel accounts available in any Indian language.

The historic journey to Rome to represent the grievances of Kerala's Syrian Catholics started from the boat jetty in Athirampuzha at Poothathil Ittikuruvilla Tharakan’s home (a Knanaya tax-collector who greatly funded the mission) in 1785. From Athirampuzha they first proceeded to Kayamkulam by a country-boat. The journey then took them to Chinnapattanam, as Chennai was then known. From there they went to Kandy in Ceylon (Sri Lanka of today). From Ceylon they sailed to Cape of Good Hope at the tip of Africa. They were to sail to Portugal from there but adverse winds drifted their ship in the Atlantic Ocean taking it to the coast of Latin America. A further journey from the Latin American coast took them to their destination.

The journey to the destination took more than a year. While they were in Europe, Mar Joseph Kariattil was ordained in Portugal as the Bishop of Kodungalloor Archdiocese - the first native Indian to get this appointment. The two representatives of the Kerala Catholic Church succeeded in convincing the church authorities in Rome and Lisbon about the problems in Kerala Church. On their way back home they stayed in Goa where Mar Kariattil died. Upon realizing that his end was near, Mar Kariattil appointed Thoma Kathanar as the Governador (governor) of Cranganore Archdiocese after him, and handed over the cross, chain and ring, the tokens of his power, which had been presented to him by the Portuguese queen.
