= Thachil Matthoo Tharakan =

Indian trader and Christian leader

Thachil Mar Mathoo Tharakan
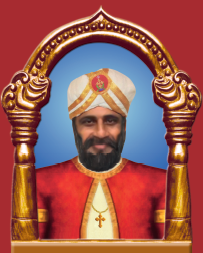
- Thachil Mar Mathoo Tharakan
- Born: 1741; Alangad, North Paravur
- Died: 1814 (aged 72–73); North Kuthiathode

Thachil Mar Matthoo Tharakan (1741–1814) was a Saint Thomas Christian merchant, social leader and minister who played a key role in Kerala, especially in its Travancore and Cochin regions, in India towards the latter part of the 18th century and early 19th century. He relentlessly worked to bring about a reunification in his community which was divided into Catholic (Pazhayakūr) and Jacobite (Puthenkūr) after the Coonan Cross Oath of 1653. He organized his community against the colonialist attempts of Portuguese and played a prominent role in the assembly of Catholic Saint Thomas Christians at Angamāly that paved the way for the establishment of independent Syro-Malabar hierarchy.

== Trader and exporter ==
Matthoo belonged to Alangad, near North Kuthiathode, in the present Paravur Taluk of Ernakulam District. He was born into a prosperous Syro-Malabar Christian family in 1741 as the son of Thariath of the Thachil family and Itti Anna of the Ukken family. He did business successfully, with the help of his father's friends, Ranga Shenoy and Narayana Shenoy, prospered, and the friends that he made during that period later took him to great heights. His powerful friends included Captain Eustachius De Lannoy, the Dutch commander who became head of the Travancore Army and Raja Kesava Das. Through such friends, he got introduced to the Kings of Travancore and Cochin.It was on 943 M.E. that Mathoo Tharakan began his royal service.

Matthoo Tharakan thus became a leading trader and influential Christian leader, from among the Indian Syriac Christians of Kerala.

He awarded a 'Thankakompan' that earned the king's appreciation and the king then awarded him the title' Mathoo Tharakan Muthalali Avarkal' . The title Tharakan was granted by the King Dharma Raja of Travancore to indicate 'a noble trader'. Matthoo Tharakan was a merchant of timber, spices, salt, and tobacco, and was reportedly the first timber exporter from Southern India.

== Minister of Travancore ==
Matthoo Tharakan was Commerce Minister to Maharaja Balarama Varma of Travancore. His best years were during the reign of Dharma Raja. He loaned a large sum of money to the Kingdom to help fight its wars against Tipu Sultan. However, during the following period of Jayanthan Sankaran Nampoothiri's Dewanship, there was an uprising and revolt led by Velu Thampi against British corruption, which had been aided by Tarakan. This led to Velu Thampi becoming the Dalawa (Prime Minister) in 1801. Velu Thampi punished Mathu Tharakan (his ear was cut and later he was imprisoned). He ordered confiscation of Matthoo Tharakan's landholdings and assets alleging that he had to pay huge revenue arrears to the Government of Travancore. This order was later cancelled by the British Resident Macaulay. Velu Thampi's subsequent resistance to the British led to his suicide in 1809 in Mannadi Temple, Adoor. Balarama Varma then symbolically gave Tharakan a golden ear.

== Social and religious leader ==
Thachil Matthoo Tharakan made attempts at reunion of the Christian communities separated by the Coonan Cross Oath. But his efforts were apparently thwarted by the Portuguese. His efforts had the support of Mar Joseph Kariattil of the Indian Syriac-Rite Catholics, and of Mar Dionysius I of the Indian Syriac-Rite Orthodox faction, known as the Jacobites. But Bishop Kariattil's death in Goa and Rome's silence, ultimately led to the Indian Jacobites remaining separate and the Indian Syriac Catholic accepting the jurisdiction of the Latin Bishops in India. He was actively involved in organising the historic journey of Mar Joseph Kariattil and Paremmakkal Thoma Kathanar to Rome in 1782 for representing before the Pope the grievances of the Syriac Catholics.

Tharakan was instrumental in organising an assembly of the Catholic Saint Thomas Christians (Pazhayakūttukār) in Angamāly Saint George's Great Church, that enacted the Angamāly Padiyōla on 1 February 1787. This assembly protested against the colonial subjugation of the native Christians and strongly urged for the consecration of native bishop among them.

== Sources ==
- Malekandathil, Pius (2013). "Nazrani History and Discourse on Early Nationalism in Varthamanapusthakam". NSC Network.
