= Thachil =

Thachil is the name of an ancient lineage of families now centred in Ernakulam (district), Kerala State. The family originated from North Kuthiathode. Thachil Matthoo Tharakan was a significant figure in the history of the families and Travancore State.

== History ==
Oral tradition has it that St Thomas, the disciple of Jesus Christ who came to India in 52 AD, landed in the port town of Kodungalloor in Kerala and established a Christian community there. Later a group of Syrian Christians led by Thomas of Cana landed in Kodungalloor between 4th and 9th centuries. Emperor Cheraman Perumal welcomed them and gave all help to the expatriates for settlement. They established and operated the famous Mahadevar Pattanam a market town. The expatriates were wealthy and through their successful business activities became prosperous. Thomas of Cana led a group of 72 families, as well as clergymen, when he arrived at the Malabar Coast. There they encountered and supplemented the Saint Thomas Christians, previously evangelized by Thomas the Apostle in the 1st century. Copper plates referring to this story exist, but are of a substantially later date. During the war, Mahadevar Pattanam was destroyed and many expatriate families moved down the coast to Travancore in the south.

Thachil Illam was one of the famous Brahmin Tharavad in Kerala. Thachil Brahmins were chief priests in the Thirumoozhikkulam Temple. They were converted to Christianity and migrated to Kuthiathode. Some believe that they were converted to Christianity by Thomas of Cana (Knai Thomman). Thachil Variyath is the patriarch of the family who migrated to Kuthiathode.

== Branches ==
Thachil family branched into over 20 sub families, quite a few of them have migrated to different places like the Alangad Thachils who settled in Angamaly. Some of the sub Thachil families who have roots in North Kuthiathode are as follows:

- Alangad Thachil (settled in Angamaly)
- Chavedyil
- Kanjirakkatu
- Kolenchery
- Kalapurakal
- Kambolam Kandathil
- Kovattu
- Kizhakke Veetil
- Kizhakke Ambattu
- Manakkalakatuttu
- Padinjare Ambattu
- Puthenveettil
- Vadakkeveetil

Some of the other sub Thachil families are Kannai from Puthenchira, Kanjirakattu from N Paravur and Poochoodan from Angamali.

== See also ==
- Thachil Matthoo Tharakan
- Saint Thomas Christians
- Tharavad
