= Marth Mariam Syro-Malabar Church, Kuravilangad =

Syro-Malabar Catholic parish in India

Marth Mariam Church
- Major Archepiscopal Marth Mariam Archdeacon Pilgrim Church, Kuravilangad
- Kuravilangad Church
- കുറവിലങ്ങാട് പള്ളി
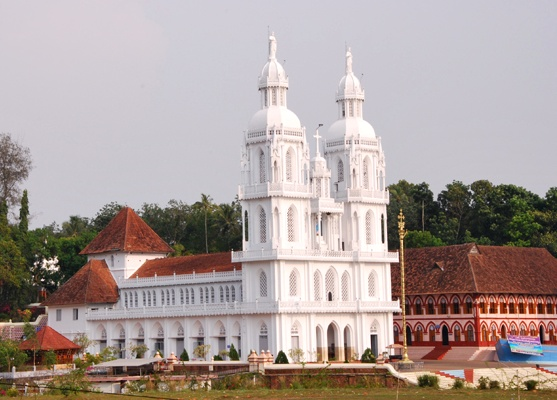
- Major Archepiscopal Marth Mariam Archdeacon Pilgrim Church
- Marth Mariam Church
- Location: Kottayam district
- Country: India
- Denomination: Catholic Church
- Sui iuris church: Syro-Malabar Catholic Church
- Tradition: Saint Thomas Christian
- Website: http://kuravilangadpally.com/

History
- Status: Major archepiscopal church
- Founded: 105 A.D
- Dedication: Marth Mariam

Architecture
- Functional status: Active
- Architectural type: Persian

Administration
- Archdiocese: Changanacherry
- Diocese: Palai

Clergy
- Archbishop: Mar Thomas Tharayil (archbishop of Changanassery)
- Bishop: Mar Joseph Kallarangatt

The Major Archiepiscopal Marth Mariam Archdeacon Pilgrim Church (Marth Mariam Syro-Malabar Church) is a church belonging to the Syro-Malabar Catholic Church located in Kuravilangad in Kottayam district, India. It is considered the Mother Church of the St.Thomas Christians of India. Claiming to date to 105 AD, the church has an ancient bell with the engraving “Mother of God” in the Syriac language; three majestic bells were brought from Germany in 1911 and are among the largest in Asia. The church is also known for its Kappalottam or "racing ship," a commemoration of the biblical story of Jonah and the Whale.

== History ==
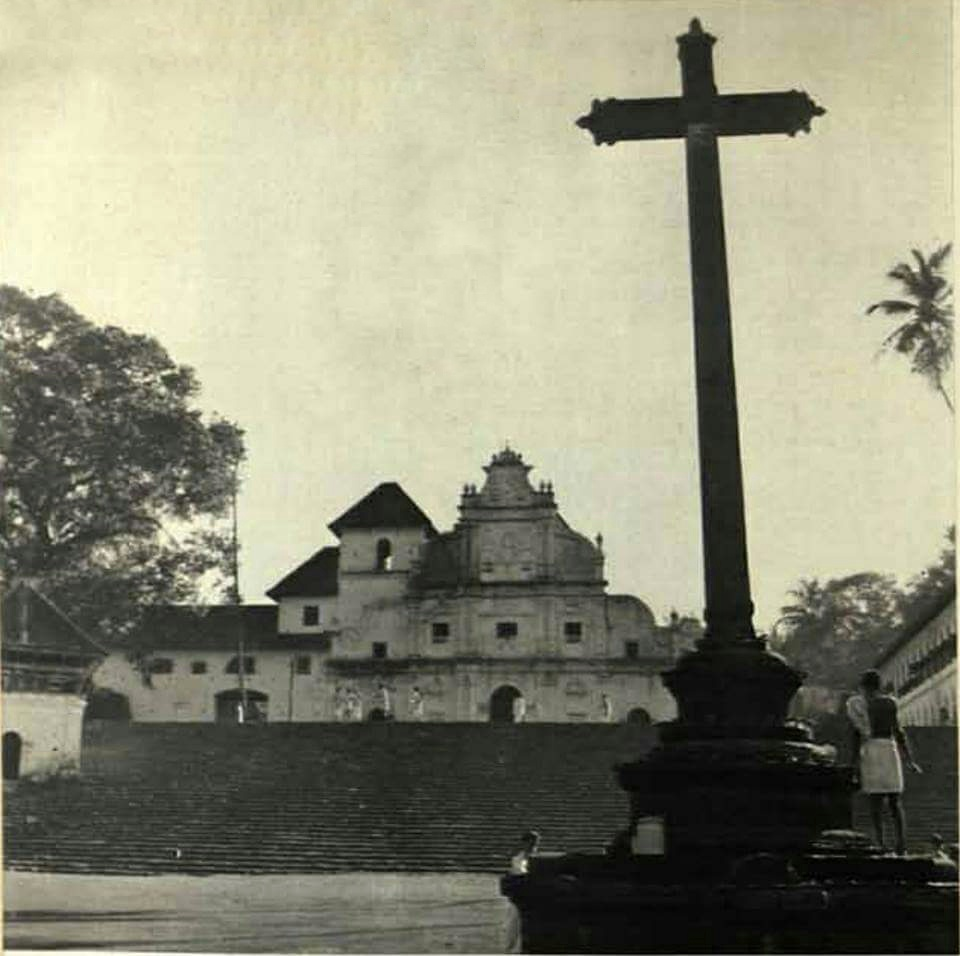

=== Early Christians ===
Christians have lived in Kuravilangad since the 1st century.

According to the tradition of the St. Thomas Christians, St. Thomas, one of the twelve apostles of Jesus Christ, came to Kerala in AD 52. He established a church, now known as the St. Thomas Syro-Malabar Church in Palayur, Chavakkad, which is presently in the Thrissur District of Kerala. He baptised some Hindu families - Kalli, Kalikavu, Pakalomattom and Sankarapuri.

The Pakalomattom and Sankarapuri families left Palayur and eventually settled in Kuravilangad.

=== Apparitions at Kuravilangad ===
Some children were tending to sheep in the early morning in the molehills of Kuravilangad. Hunger and thirst caused by the heat compelled them to search for springs and edible roots and tubers. Their hunt for food and water carried them a long way away from their homes and they became trapped in the paths of the jungle. The children pleaded to God to rain food and drink on them.

In response to their ardent supplications, in the desolate forest, a woman with a child carrying a cross in his hands appeared to the children. The woman picked up stones, which transformed into bread, and gave it to the children. She also used her fingers to quarry the soil, and a spring of water arose. Once the children had ate and drank, they searched for the woman, but could not find her. Since it was already dusk, the children returned home in amazement.

=== The Church ===
The children narrated the whole incident, the apparition of the woman, and how she satiated their hunger and thirst to their parents the moment they reached home, with wonder and amazement. Unable to believe their ears and considering the whole episode unusual and unnatural, the elders accompanied by the children soon set out to the forest. When they arrived at the spot the children had indicated, they were petrified upon perceiving a spring, brimming with crystal clear water in an otherwise drought-stricken area.

The Blessed Virgin Mary, carrying infant Jesus, appeared once again and directed them to build a Church in her name at that very spot. As the people genuflected to pay their homage to her, she disappeared.

Hence, the church is named after Mary, the Mother of God. "Marth Mariam" is an East Syriac translation of "St. Mary".

== Gallery ==
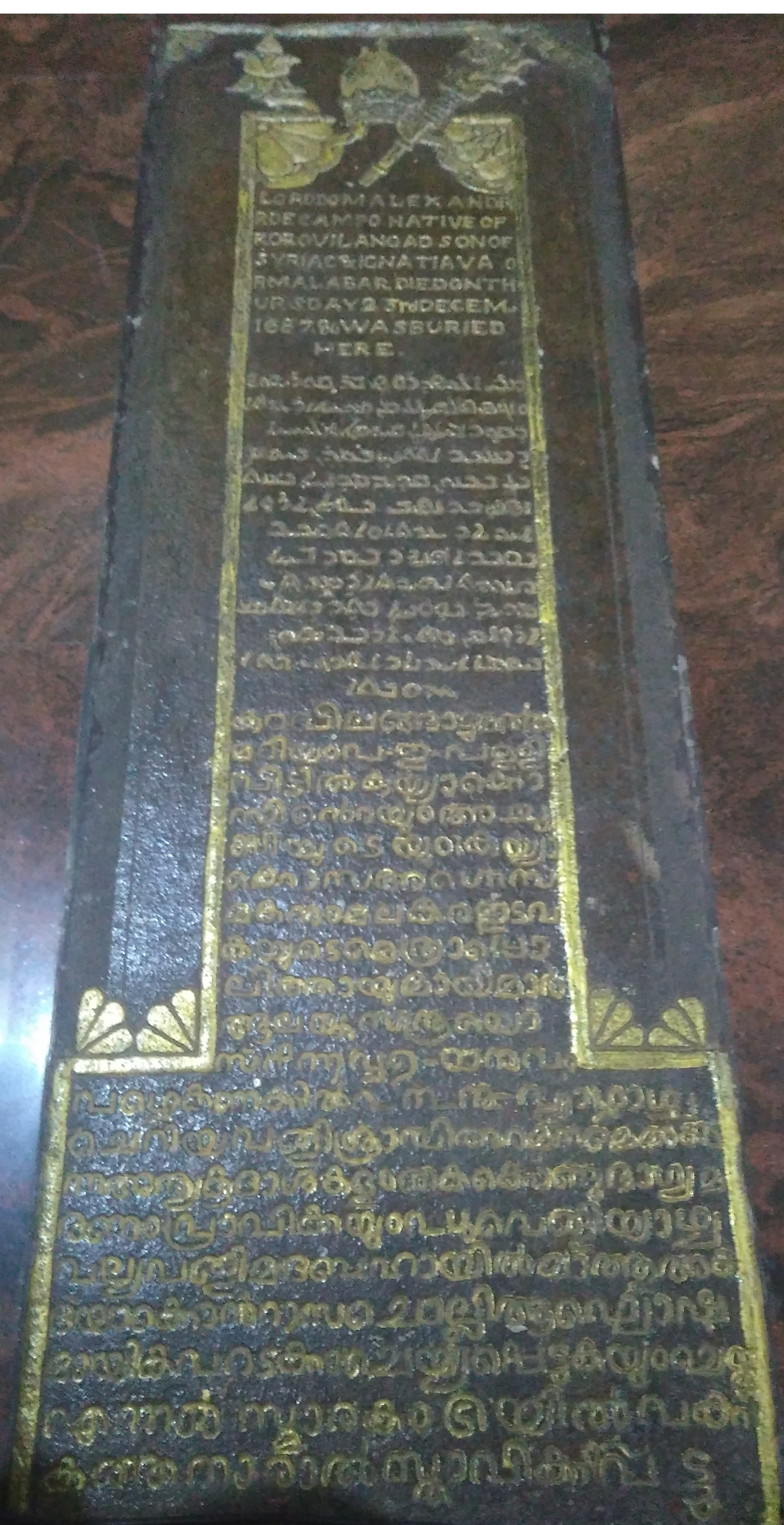
Tomb of Palliveettil Mar Chandy, inside the Madbaha of Church.

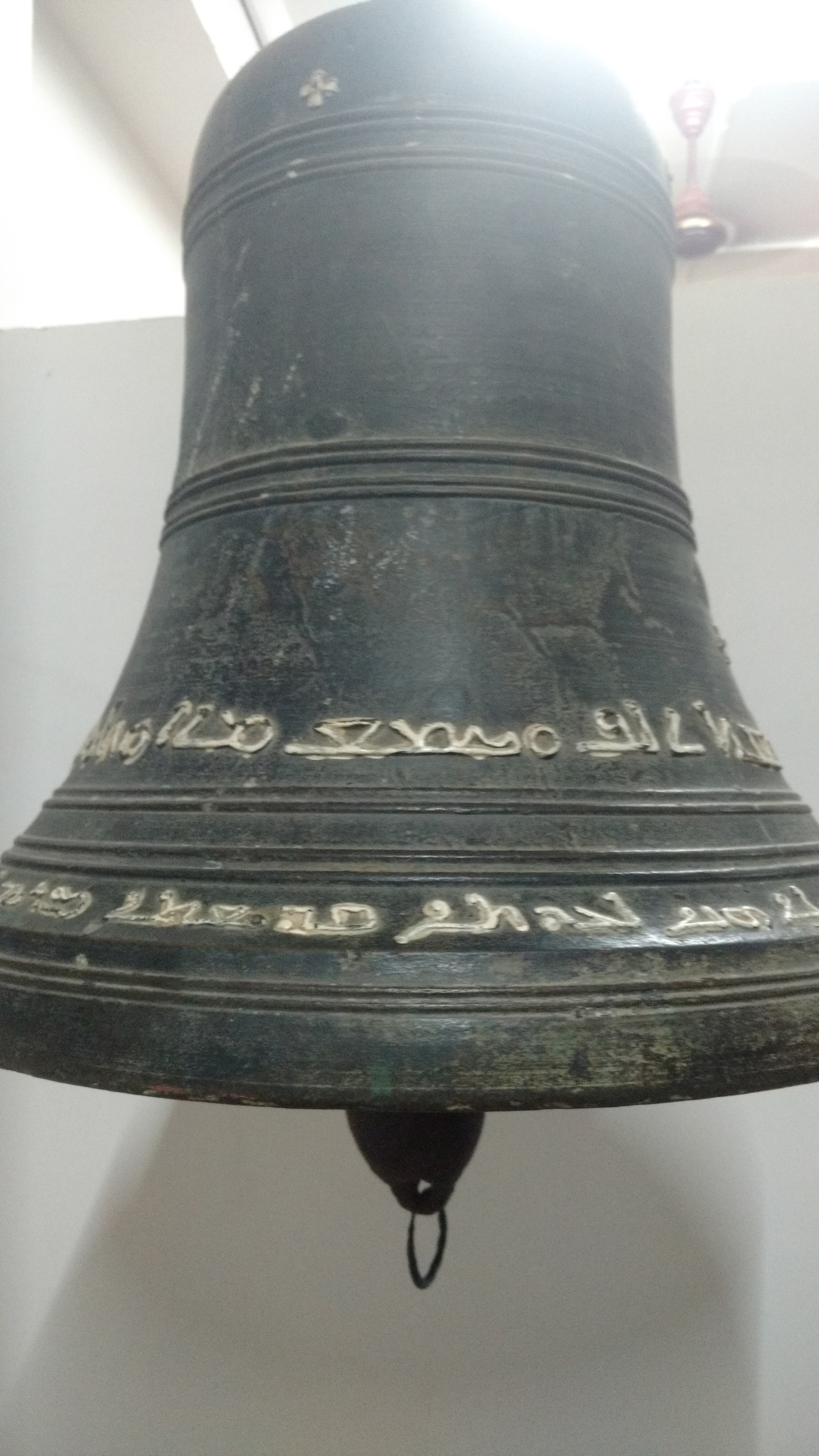
Bell at Kuravilangad with Syriac inscription

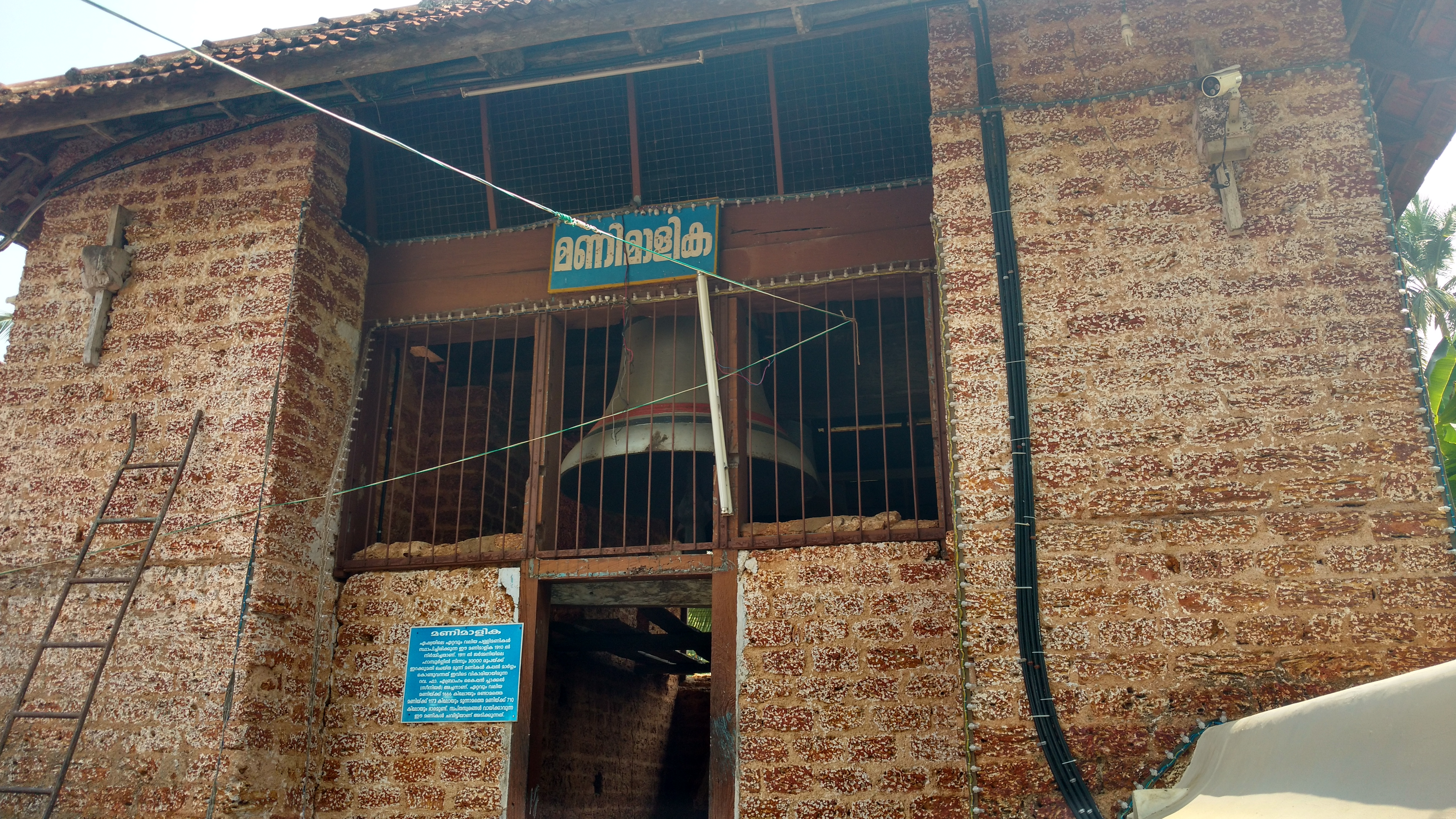
Bell House at Kuravilangad Church

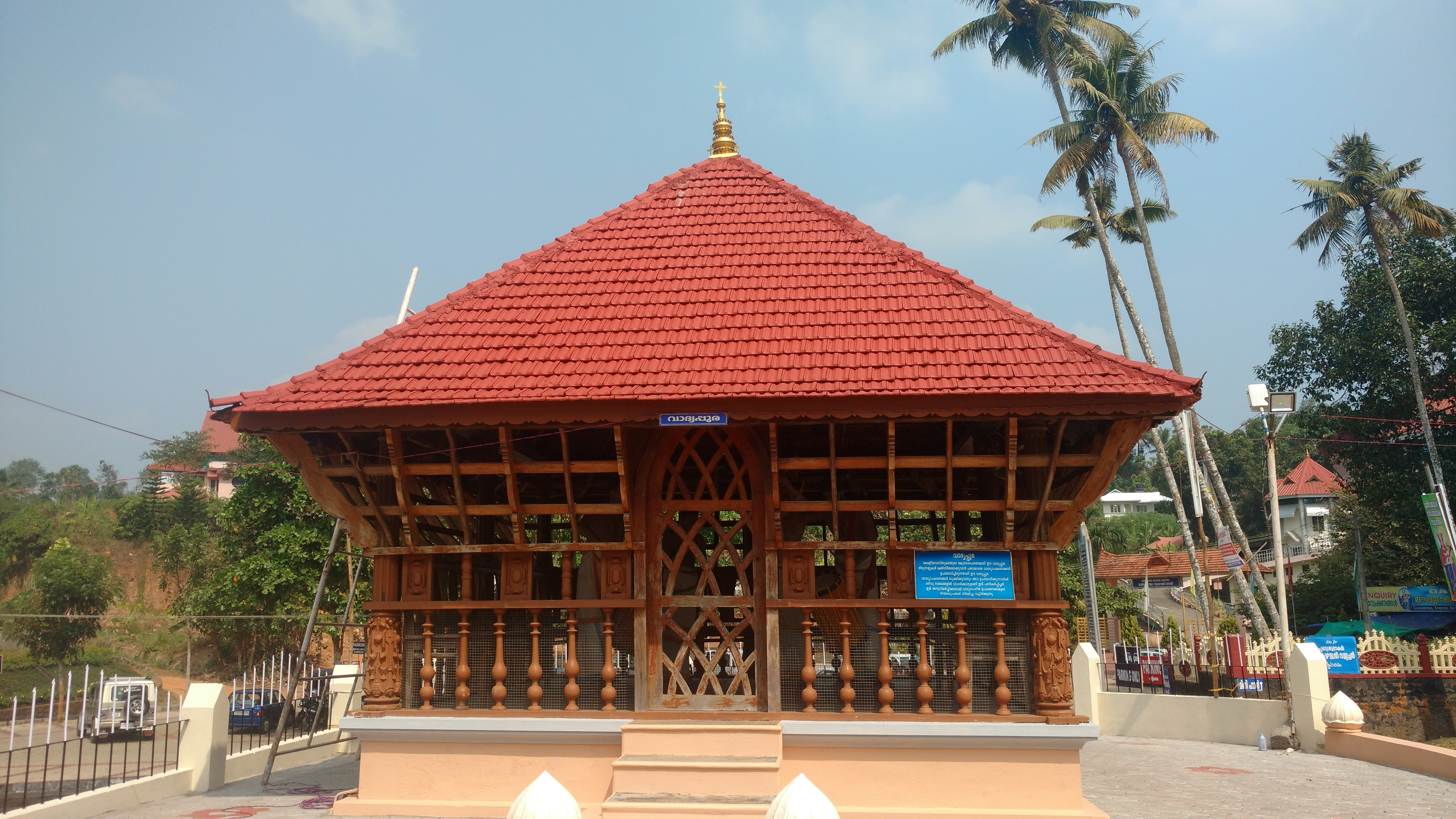
Music House at Kuravilangad Church

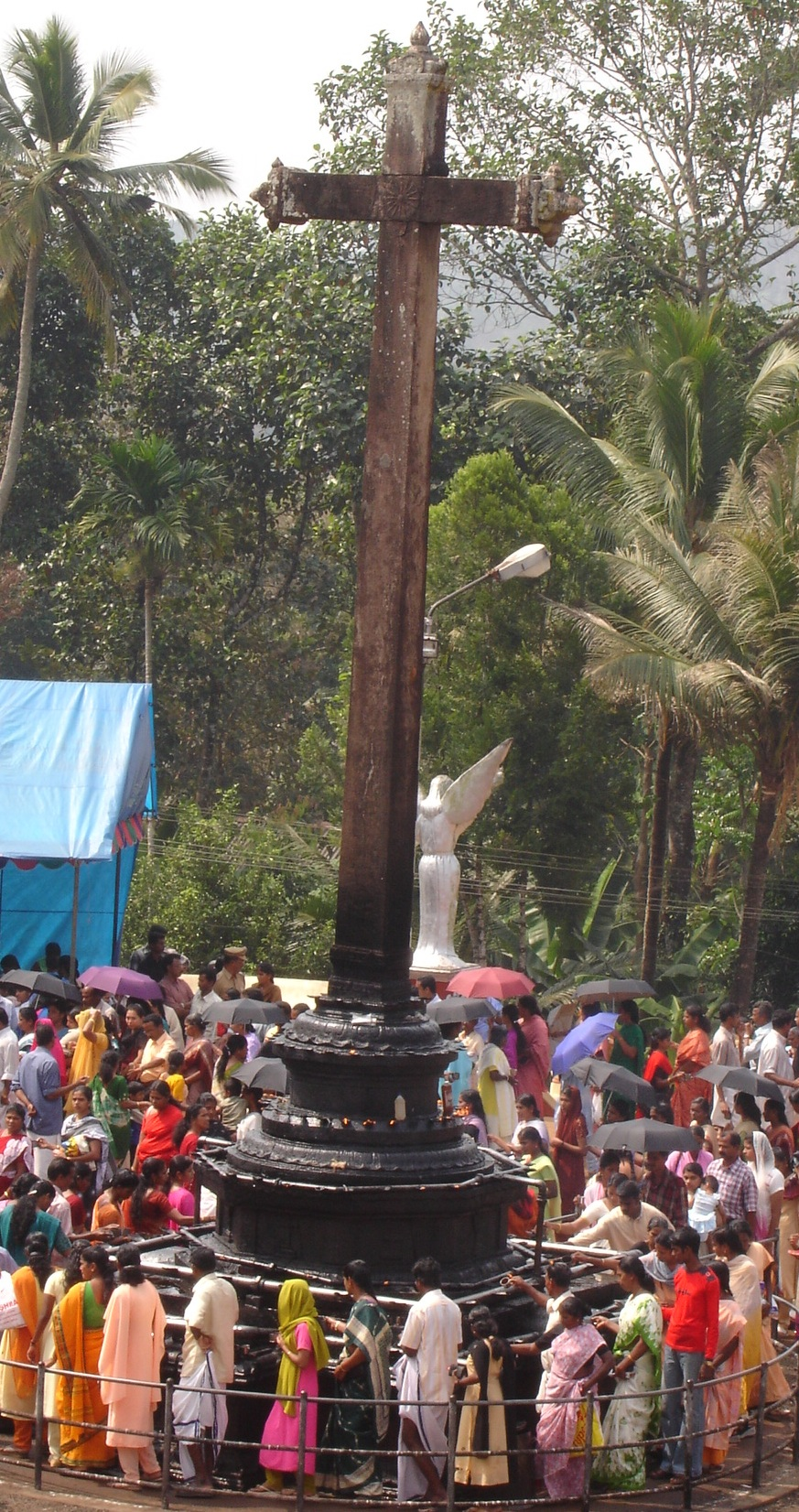
Cross in front of the Church

== Bibliography ==
- Nedungatt, George (2001). The Synod of Diamper Revisited. Pontificio Istituto Orientale. ISBN 9788872103319.
