= Palliveettil Chandy =

17th-century Indian Christian bishop

Mar Chandy Parampil
- Metropolitan and Gate of All India.
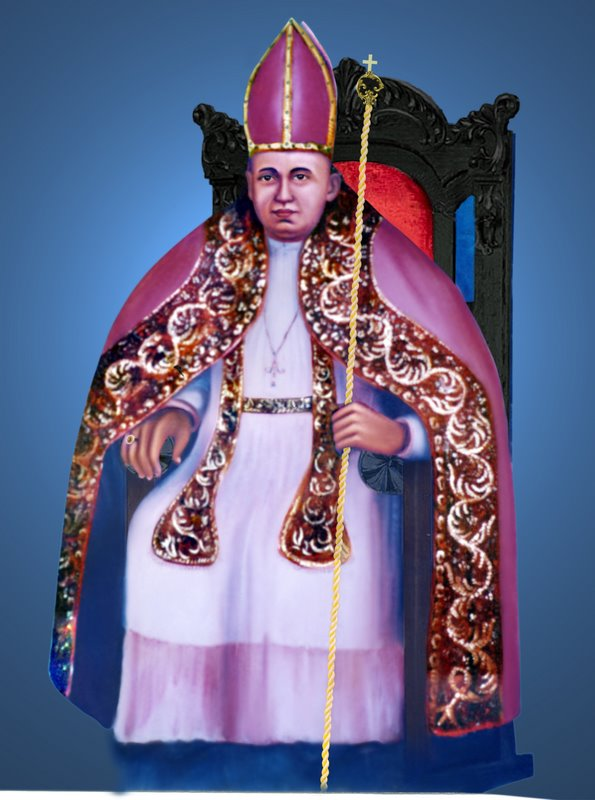
- Diocese: Archdiocese of Cranganore
- See: Kodungallur (Muziris) of the Marthoma Nazrenes.
- Installed: 31 January 1663
- Term ended: 2 January 1687
- Predecessor: Abraham of Angamaly
- Successor: Kariattil Ousep

Orders
- Ordination: 31 January 1663

Personal details
- Born: Chandy; 1615 Muttuchira
- Died: 2 January 1687 (aged 71–72) Kuravilangad
- Buried: St. Mary's Syro-Malabar Major Archiepiscopal Church Kuravilangad

Parampil Chandy (Alexandre de Campo in Portuguese; 1615 – 2 January 1687), also called Palliveettil Chandy, was an Indian Catholic prelate who served as Archbishop of Cranganore from 1663 to 1687. He was the first known native Indian bishop.

As archbishop, Chandy headed the East Syriac faction known as the Paḻayakūṟ, or "Old Allegiance", after the Coonan Cross Oath in 1653 brought secession from the Portuguese Padroado. The faction soon returned to full communion with the Holy See as Eastern Catholics and would later become known as the Syro-Malabar Church. Chandy, whose efforts to reconcile the other dissident Indian factions ultimately failed, died in 1687 and his tomb is at the Marth Mariam Church in Kuravilangad.

== See also ==
- Kadavil Chandy Kathanar
- Syro-Malabar Catholic Church
- List of Syro-Malabar Catholics
- Timeline of the Syro-Malabar Catholic Church
- Christianity in India
- Saint Thomas Christians
