= Augustine Kandathil =

First Indian Archbishop and First Head of the Catholic Church of St. Thomas (1874–1956)

- Head of Syro-Malabar Church and Metropolitan Archbishop of Ernakulam
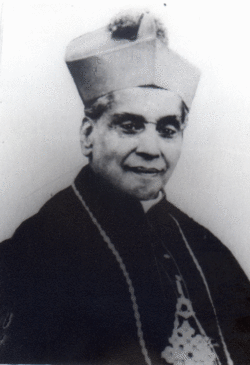
- Diocese: Ernakulam
- Installed: 3 December 1911
- Term ended: 10 January 1956
- Predecessor: Joseph Kariattil as the head of the Syro-Malabar Church; Aloysius Pazheparambil as the immediately preceding vicar-apostolic of Ernakulam
- Successor: Antony Padiyara as the head of the Syro-Malabar Church; Joseph Parecattil as the immediately succeeding archbishop of Ernakulam.

Orders
- Ordination: 21 December 1901

Personal details
- Born: 25 August 1874 Chempu
- Died: 10 January 1956 (aged 81) Ernakulam

Augustine Kandathil (25 August 1874 – 10 January 1956) was Metropolitan and head of the Syro-Malabar Church, 1923–1956.

He was ordained as a priest at Kandy on 21 December 1901.

Catholic Church titles
Preceded by Aloysius Pazheparambil	Archbishop of Ernakulam; 1919–1956	Succeeded by Joseph Parecattil
