= Kariyattil Yawsep =

Catholic archbishop (1742–1786)

Mar Yawsep Kariattil
- Metropolitan Archbishop of Kodungallūr
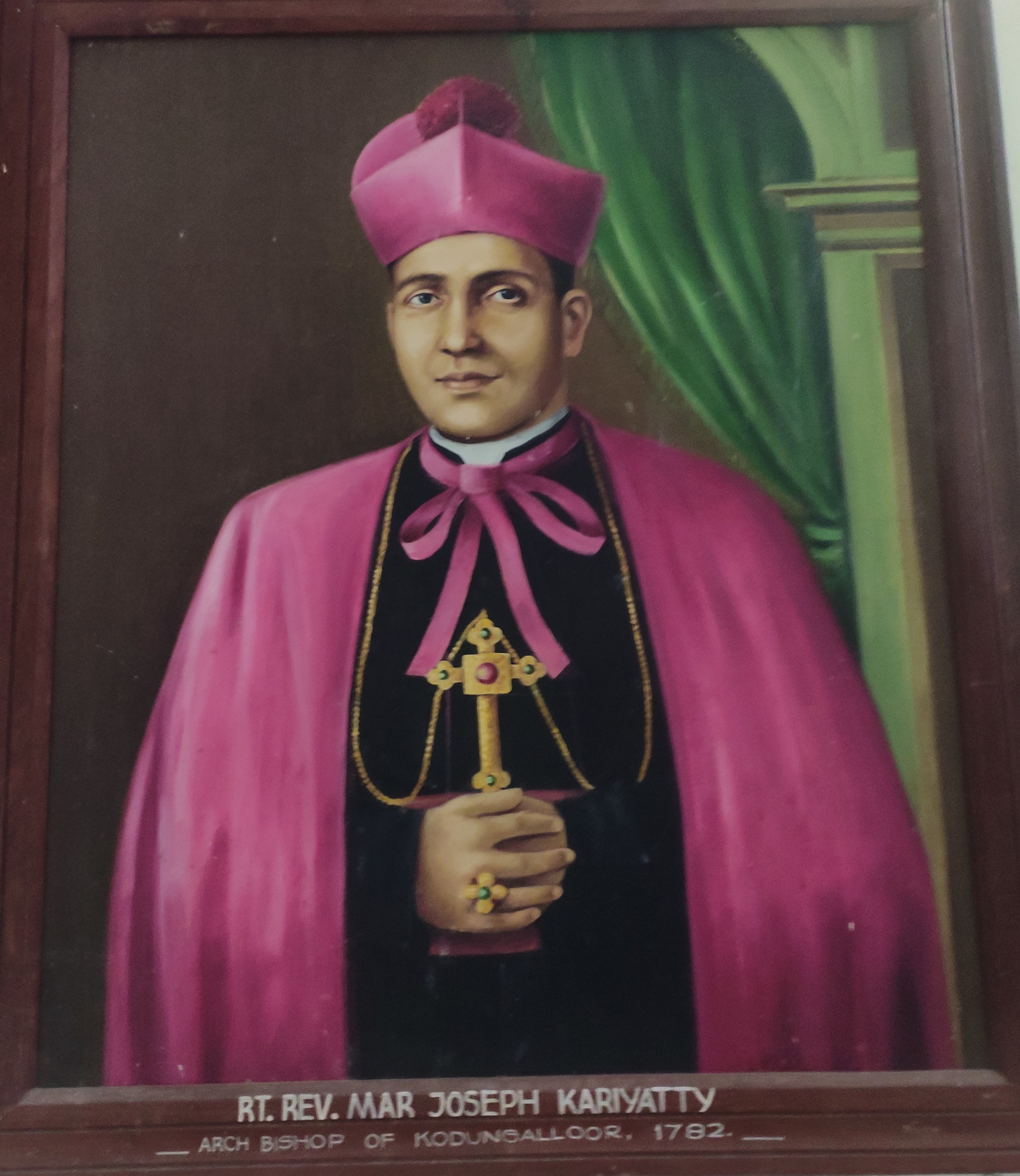
- Metropolitan and Gate of All India Mar Joseph Kariyatti
- Native name: Kuriap
- Church: Chaldean Syrian Catholics
- Archdiocese: Kodungallūr
- Appointed: 16 December 1782
- Term ended: 10 September 1786
- Predecessor: Parambil Mar Chandy as the head of the Syro-Malabar Church
- Successor: Abraham Paulose Pandari as the Chaldean Archbishop of Cranganore; Thoma Paremmakkal (Gubernator of the Archdiocese of Cranganore); Augustine Kandathil as the Metropolitan head of the Syro-Malabar Church
- Other post: Apostolic Missionary from Urban university Rome
- Previous post: East Syriac Aramaic Malpan of Alangad Malpanate.

Orders
- Ordination: 25 March 1766
- Consecration: 17 February 1783
- Rank: Metropolitan Archbishop

Personal details
- Born: Yawsep; 5 May 1742 Alangad (Kerala, India)
- Died: 10 September 1786 (aged 44) Goa
- Buried: St. Mary's Syro-Malabar Church, Alangad
- Parents: Pailey and Mariam
- Education: Doctorates in Philosophy, Theology and Canon Law.
- Alma mater: Pontifical Urban University, Rome

Kariyattil Mar Yawsep, variantly spelled as Joseph Kariattil, José Cariatti, Ousep Kariatti, (5 May 1742 – 10 September 1786) was the first native Indian to be appointed as Metropolitan of Kodungalloor (Cranganore) for Chaldean Syrian Catholics in the territory now comprising Kerala, India.

== Early life ==
Yawsep was born on 5 May 1742 to the Kariattil house, in Alangad, Kerala. He began his religious education at the local seminary in Alangad before being sent to the Pontifical Urban University, in Rome in 1755. At the age of 13, he pursued advanced studies in philosophy, theology, and canon law. He was ordained a priest in Rome and earned doctoral degrees in these disciplines, becoming one of the first Indian nationals to achieve this distinction in the 18th century.

== Vocation ==
=== Return to India ===
Fr. Kariattil returned to India in 1766, where he was appointed as a Malpan (religious instructor) at the Alangad Seminary. He was known for his efforts to reconcile the divisions within the Saint Thomas Christian community, which had split following the Coonan Cross Oath. Working closely with prominent lay leader Thachil Mathu Tharakan, Kariattil supported the efforts of Francis De Sales, the Apostolic Vicar of Varapuzha, to settle in Alangad Church in 1776.

=== Efforts Toward Unification ===
In 1777, Fr. Kariattil traveled to St. Mary's Church, Niranam to meet with Mar Thoma VI, the leader of the Puthenkoor (Jacobite) faction, to discuss potential reunification with the Pazhankoor (Catholic) faction. His mission for unity was not fully embraced by all, as the Padroado missionaries opposed the reunification of the Nasranis (Saint Thomas Christians), and Propaganda missionaries did not actively promote it either.

==== Journey to Rome ====
In 1778, Kariattil embarked on a significant journey to Rome with Paremmakkal Thoma Kathanar to present the issue of unification to church authorities. During this journey, he also met Queen Maria I of Portugal, the royal patron of the Padroado. Impressed by his humility, intellect, and religious dedication, the Queen appointed Kariattil as the Archbishop of Kodungalloor (Cranganore) on 16 July 1782, in Lisbon. He was consecrated as the Archbishop on 17 February 1783, at the São Bento Monastery Church in Lisbon.

Pope Pius VI later confirmed his appointment, making Mar Yawsep Kariattil the first native Indian Archbishop of the Archdiocese of Kodungalloor. He also received the pallium, a symbol of his office as Metropolitan Archbishop, from the Pope on 17 March 1783. Kariattil was given full authority to pursue the unification of the Saint Thomas Christians, including the Puthenkoor faction led by Mar Thoma VI.

== Death ==
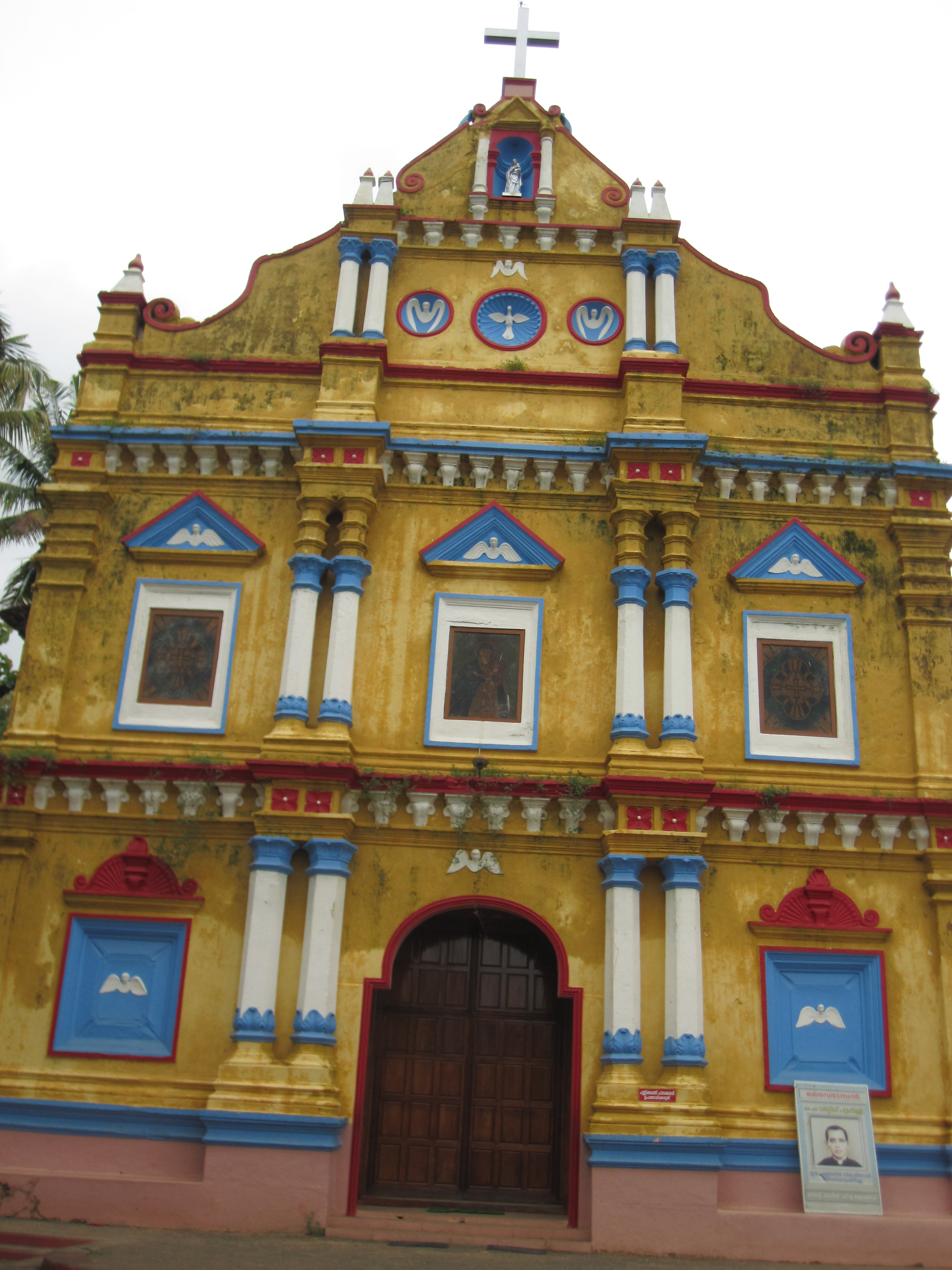
St. Mary's Syro-Malabar Church, Alangad houses the tomb of Kariatil Mar Ouseph

Mar Yawsep Kariattil died on 10 September 1786, in Goa while en route back to India. His initial burial took place in Goa, but in 1961, his remains were transferred to St. Mary's Syro-Malabar Catholic Church in Alangad.

== Writings ==
Kariattil authored two notable works: Vedatharkkam (Dialectics on Theology) in 1768 and Noticias do Reino do Malabar in 1780. Additionally, he issued an official letter as Archbishop on July 16, 1783.

== See also ==
- Syro-Malabar Catholic Church
- List of Syro-Malabar Catholics
- Timeline of the Syro-Malabar Catholic Church
- Christianity in India
- Saint Thomas Christians
