= Paremmakkal Thoma =

Indian author and administrator

Mar Paremmakkal Thoma Kathanar
- Administrator of the Archeparchy of Kodungalloor
- Church: Syro-Malabar Church
- Diocese: Kodungallur
- Installed: 1786
- Term ended: 1799
- Predecessor: Kariattil Mar Ousep

Orders
- Ordination: 1786

Personal details
- Born: Thoma; 10 September 1736 Kadanad, Kingdom of Travancore (modern day Kerala, India)
- Died: 20 March 1799 (aged 62) Ramapuram, Kingdom of Travancore (modern day Kerala, India)
- Buried: Ramapuram, Kerala, India
- Denomination: Malankara Church (Paḻayakūṟ)

Paremmakkal Thoma Kathanar (1736–1799) is the author of Varthamanappusthakam (1790), the first ever travelogue in an Indian language. Also known as Roma Yatraa Varthamanapusthakam, it postulates that the foundation of Indian nationalism rests on the basic principle that India should achieve civic self-rule. Long before the debates on nationalism shaking the intellectual circles of Europe, Asia, and Africa, Thoma Kathanar offers a distinctive positionality as a minority Syriac Christian priest and subsequent administrator of the Archdiocese of Cranganore with transnational ties to Portuguese ecclesiology who nevertheless argues in favor of autonomous civic Indian governance.

He was also a polyglot, an efficient administrator and priest of the Malankare Kaldaya Suriyani Sabha (known officially as the Syro-Malabar Catholic Church since 1923), who tried to bring about unity in the Church and also to maintain its unique heritage.

Paremmakkal Thoma was born as the fourth child of Paremmakkal Itty Chandy and Anna of Kadanad in Kottayam district on 10 September 1736. Initially he studied Sanskrit and Syriac from teachers nearby. Then he joined Alengad Seminary to learn Latin and Portuguese and for priesthood. In 1761, he was ordained as a Kathanar (priest). He served as vicar in different churches up to 1778.

Thomma Kathanar made tireless efforts to bring about unity in the Church in Kerala which had split following the Coonan Cross Oath. He also strived to get bishops from among the members of the Catholic Church in Kerala, and also to retain the rich heritage of the Malabar Church. In order to achieve those goals he undertook a hard and perilous journey to Rome in 1778 along with Kariattil Mar Ousep Malpan.

The description of this journey is recorded in his book Varthamanapusthakam, considered to be the first travelogue among all Indian languages. The historic journey to Rome to represent the grievances of Kerala's Syrian Catholics started from the boat jetty in Athirampuzha in 1785. From Athirampuzha they first proceeded to Kayamkulam by a country-boat. The journey then took them to Chinnapattanam, as Chennai was then known. From there they went to Kandy in Ceylon (Sri Lanka of today). From Ceylon they sailed to Cape of Good Hope at the tip of Africa. They were to sail to Portugal from there but adverse winds drifted their ship in the Atlantic Ocean taking it to the coast of Latin America. A further journey from the Latin American coast took them to their destination.

The journey to the destination took more than a year. While they were in Europe, Kariattil Mar Ousep was ordained in Portugal as the Bishop of Kodungalloor Archeparchy. The two representatives of the Kerala Catholic Church succeeded in convincing the church authorities in Rome and Lisbon about the problems in Kerala Church. On their way back home they stayed in Goa where Mar Ouseph Kariattil died. Upon realizing that his end was near, Mar Kariattil appointed Thoma Kathanar as the Governador (governor) of Cranganore Archdiocese after him, and handed over the cross, chain and ring, the tokens of his power, which had been presented to him by the Portuguese queen.

Although the headquarters of Archdiocese of Kodungallur was at Pookkaatt, Aripalam muri of Mukundapuram taluk before their journey, the new Governador administered the affairs of the church establishing his headquarters at Angamaly. Paremmakkal was organised and led an assembly of the Catholic Saint Thomas Christians (Palazhayakūttukār) in Angamāly Saint George's Great Church, that enacted the Angamāly Padiyōla on 1 February 1787. This assembly protested against the colonial subjugation of the native Christians and strongly urged for the consecration of native bishop among them. 1790, the headquarters of the Archdiocese had to be shifted to Vadayar because of the attacks of Tippu Sultan. In the last four years of his life, Thoma Kathanar managed church administration from his own parish, Ramapuram.

The history of travelogues in Malayalam is short but exciting and absorbing. The first work in the genre Varthamapusthakam was written by P. Thoma Kathanar (1736–99) in the latter part of the eighteenth century but its existence was totally forgotten by later generations. It was discovered in 1935 and was printed next year. Sankaran Namboothiri informs that Kathanar accompanied K. Yausep Malpan in his journey from Parur to Rome. They went by foot up to Madras from where they sailed. They took along route via Cape of Good Hope, South America and Lisbon. The voyage lasted nearly eight years." It is-certainly one of the most valuable travel accounts available in any Indian language.

Paremmakkal Thoma Kathanar remained the Governador for thirteen years. He died on 20 March 1799.

Vathamanapusthakam was first published in the 18th century but was forgotten for centuries, being re-discovered in 1935 and first printed in Malayalam in 1936 by Luka Mathai Plathottam at Athirampuzha St Marys Press. The manuscript of the book is kept at the St Thomas Christian Museum in Kochi.

== See also ==
Joseph the Indian
