= Archdeacon of All India =

Historical leadership title in Indian Christianity

- Jatikkukartavyan
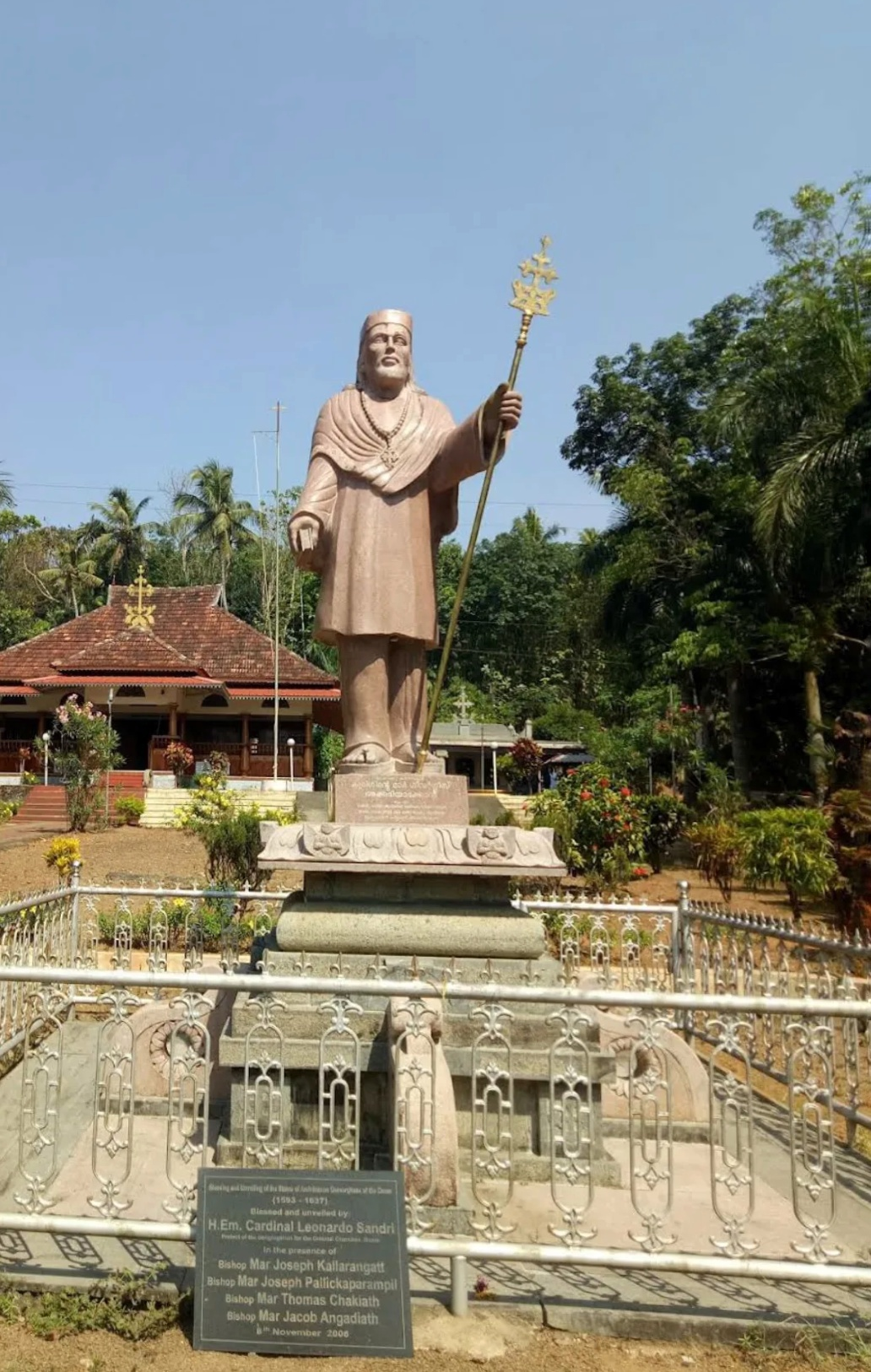
- A statue of Archdeacon Gīwargīs of Cross from the Archdeaconate Mausoleum in Kuravilangad
- Native name: Akhilēntyayute Arkkadiākkōn; Jātikku kartavyan
- Archdiocese: East Syriac metropolis of All India, Archdiocese of Angamaly, Archdiocese of Cranganore

The Archdeacon of All India was the chief of the hierarchy of native priests in the Church of the East in India and was the ethno-religious leader of Saint Thomas Christians. The archdeaconate served both as an ecclesiastical functionary second only to the metropolitan bishop and as the de-facto head of the Saint Thomas Christians.

The archdeacon held significant power among the Saint Thomas Christians as their bishops were mostly West-Asians with least knowledge of the regional dynamics in Malabar. The origin of the Archdeaconate of All India is traditionally stretched to the first century Apostolic missions of Thomas the Apostle in South India. However it is only since the beginning of the sixteenth century that any definite information related to individuals who held the rank of the archdeacon is available.

With the introduction of a Latinized ecclesiastical structure in Malabar in the 16th century under Portuguese colonial rule, the powers associated with the archdeaconate were significantly curtailed and became contested by the Latin prelates. In the mid-17th century, the last undisputed archdeacon Thoma Parambil led the native Christian revolt against the Portuguese, the most momentous of which was the Coonan Cross Oath, and was consequently declared as the native Metropolitan bishop.

== Background ==
Saint Thomas Christians constituted the East Syriac Metropolitan province of India which was headed by a Metropolitan bishop appointed by the East Syriac Catholicos-Patriarch. While the metropolitan and bishops were highly respected, the local church and community affairs were chiefly governed by a native priest, titled Archdeacon of All India.

The traditional East Syriac priestly hierarchy puts the archdeaconate as the highest of the presbyteral ranks within a diocese. The archdeacon is thus responsible for the administration of the diocese under the diocesan bishop and represents his will in his absence.

The Archdeaconate of All India, though an existing rank within the hierarchy of the Church of the East, simultaneously functioned as the indigenous political, religious and ethnic head of the Saint Thomas Christians. While the succession of bishops was often discontinuous due to the geographical isolation, the continuous governance of the diocese became the archdeacon's responsibility.

Existing tradition attributes the Malabar archdeaconate ancient origins, often extending up to the traditional accounts of Thomasine apostolic mission in the first century. These legends say that certain families such as Pakalomattam, Kalliyankal and Shankarapuri were selected for priesthood by the apostle and the chief priest from Pakalomattam lineage became the Jātikku kartavyan. The post of the Jātikku kartavyan is said to have been accommodated as the Archdeacon of All India by the Syriac missionaries who accompanied the Persian merchant missionary named Knai Thoma.

Modern academic historians ascribe the Malabar archdeaconate much later origin. Church historian Jacob Kollaparambil believes that the first historic account of an archdeacon in Malabar is from a letter by East Syriac Patriarch Timotheos I in the 9th century. The letter famously addressed to the "Arkn" or leader of the Christians in India permits the local clergy to select and enthrone their metropolitans from the suffragan bishops locally after having obtained the prior patriarchal approval. Meanwhile, Istvan Perczel disagrees with Kollaparambil by stating that the word Arkn imply a leader or a prince rather than an archdeacon. He instead theorizes that the Malabar archdeaconate is actually "an early 16th century development" and that "its existence" was retrospectively "projected" to claim "a very great antiquity". Perczel also raises the possibility that the 9th century "(quasi-) secular function" perhaps "evolved into the office of the Malabar archdeaconate".

== Giwargis I ==
Giwargis the First of Pakalomattam, or George Pakalomattam, was one among the three member delegation sent from Malabar to seek bishops from the East Syriac Catholicos-Patriarch in AG 1801 (AD 1489-1490). Mattai and Yawsep were the other members of this delegation. Giwargis and Yawsep reached Armenia after a long journey, while Mattai died on their way, and met the Patriarch Šem’on IV Basidi at the patriarchal residence in Gazarta. The patriarch ordained both of them as priests at the patriarchal church of Marrgis, noting that they were both well-trained deacons and eloquent in faith and the Syriac language. He also instructed them to select two worthy monks from the monastery of Mar Awgen. Accordingly, they selected two monks both named Yawsep. The Patriarch consecrated one of the monks, whom he named Yohannan, as the metropolitan, and the other as a bishop with the episcopal name Thoma.

The patriarch sent the two new bishops to India along with the two priests. Antonio de Gouvea, in his book Jornada of Menezis, attributes the reason for the existence of East Syriac books in Malabar, such as Parasman, to this delegation. Yohannan served in India as its metropolitan, while his companion, Thoma, after a short time, returned to the patriarch bringing with him presents from the Indian Church. Giwargis was elevated to the rank of archdeacon, while Yawsep sailed to Portugal in 1501 and then visited the Pope in Rome where he left an account of Indian Christianity. In AG 1814 (AD 1502–1503), three more bishops, namely Yahbalaha, Yaqov and Denha were consecrated in the Monastery of Yohannan the Egyptian in Gazarta by Patriarch Eliyah. Both Yahbalaha and Thoma were ordained metropolitans and all four of them were sent to India. These bishops, popularly called Marabbans, arrived in India the next year and divided the ecclesiastical province among themselves.

== Giwargis II ==
Giwargis the Second of Pakalomattam, also called Professor Giwargis or Giwargis the Elder, is historically attested to have occupied the archdeaconate under Mar Denha. He was a staunch defender of East Syriac orthodoxy and associated with Mar Denha, the youngest of the Marabbans who was unfriendly with the Portuguese. He is recorded to have accompanied Mar Denha in erecting the outdoor wooden cross at the Muttuchira Church in 1528. Mar Denha and Giwargis based their activities in Muttuchira and Kuravilangad, which was the archdeacon's homeland, located in the Vatakkumkūr Kingdom. The lithic Vatteluttu inscription from Muttuchira further states that both of them later moved to the 'Portuguese land', which Perczel interprets as the Kingdom of Cochin. Giwargis is later described as a great scholar, theologian and Syriacist who headed the Seminary (university in Carneiro's words) of Angamaly. Fransisco Dionysio and Melchior Carneiro have mentioned him, though anonymously, in their accounts. His name, however, appears in the letter of Patriarch Mar Abdisho IV Maron appointing Giwargis of Christ as the suffragan bishop to Metropolitan Abraham. The patriarch distinguishes Giwargis the Elder from his nephew by referring to him as 'Giwargis the great teacher (Malpan)'.

Previously, Giwargis had sent a letter addressed to the East Syriac patriarch, requesting the appointment of new bishops following the death of the Marabbans. Semon VII Ishoyahb Barmama, the orthodox East Syriac patriarch, responded to it by sending Mar Abraham of Gazira who arrived sometime before 1556. By 1555, the Chaldean patriarch Abdisho IV Maron had also responded by sending a metropolitan, in the person of Mar Yawsep Sulaqa, but he could not reach Malabar before 1558 as he was arrested and detained by the Portuguese at Goa. Giwargis the Elder probably died soon after or right before the arrival of Mar Abraham.

== Yaqov Nadackal ==
=== The Muttuchira Epigraphs ===
The Muttuchira epigraph also records the replacement and installation of two crosses at the Muttuchira church by Metropolitan Simeon and Priest Yaqov in 1581. Yaqov is described as the archdeacon and close associate of Mar Simeon by Portuguese accounts, such as the Jornada of Menezis. He hailed from the house of Nadackal, a branch of the Pakalomattam family, based in Muttuchira. Jacob maintained his influence from the Vatakkumkūr Kingdom, where the influence of the Portuguese was the least. The replacement of the wooden open air cross on 13 September, the date of the Feast of the Cross unique to the East Syriac tradition, demonstrates the traditionalism of these clerics in the Vatakkumkūr Kingdom.

=== Archdeacon under Mar Simeon ===
Yaqov was a staunch defender of traditionalism and opposed the latinization of liturgy and Christian life enforced by the Portuguese Jesuits, under Mar Abraham and his archdeacon Giwargis of Christ. It was Mar Abraham's conversion to Catholicism that prompted the orthodox East Syriac patriarch to send Mar Simeon to Malabar. Whether Yaqov was made archdeacon by Mar Simeon or whether he was the one who originally inherited the title from Giwargis the Elder is unclear. The presence of Mar Simeon and Yaqov, who resisted all attempts of latinisations, forced the Portuguese Jesuits to tolerate Mar Abraham at least temporarily until their Padroado ecclesiastical monopoly can be unchallengedly exercised in Malabar. Mar Simeon was taken by the Franciscans in 1584 and sent to Europe where his priestly orders were declared invalid and detained until his death in 1559. Nevertheless, Yaqov communicated with Mar Simeon through letters addressing the latter as the Metropolitan of India.

=== Anti-colonial stance ===
Yaqov strongly opposed the latinization carried out by the Jesuits nominally under Mar Abraham and defended the continuation of the East Syriac calendar and feasts. Mar Abraham convened the First Synod of Angamaly which decreed a thorough latinization of the liturgy, replacement of the East Syriac calendar and feasts with Latin counterparts and prohibition of post-ordination clerical matrimony, under Jesuit compulsion. Yaqov expanded his disapproval to the Gregorian Calendar following its formal reception in the Latin rite in 1582. Archdeacon Yaqov taught his followers to recite the traditional Chaldean raza without the Latin interpolations. Alexis Menezes, the Archbishop of Goa and the mastermind of the later Synod of Diamper, wrote to him that Mar Simeon had been convicted and his orders were declared invalid by the pope in Rome, in attempt to force the archdeacon to submit to his authority and even offered him monetary and ecclesiastical rewards. Menezis finally resorted to declare Yaqov excommunicated after failing all attempts to lure him.

== Giwargis of Christ ==
=== Chaldean Catholic Allegiance ===
==== Archdeacon under Mar Yawsep Sulaqa (1558 - 1567) ====
Giwargis of Christ was a nephew of Giwargis the Elder as recorded by Patriarch Mar Abdisho IV Maron in 1566. He was appointed archdeacon by Mar Yawsep, the first Chaldean Catholic metropolitan of India. Yawsep opposed Mar Abraham, who arrived in Malabar originally as an orthodox East Syriac metropolitan before 1556 much before his own arrival. Abraham had established himself in the Vatakkumkūr and later in the Thekkumkūr Kingdoms where the Portuguese influence was minimal. The Portuguese were completely reluctant to let Eastern bishops in Malabar and had initially detained Mar Yawsep for about 18 months in Goa. However in order to oppose Mar Abraham, they allowed Mar Yawsep to briefly occupy his see in Malabar. Giwargis initially served as the archdeacon under Mar Yawsep.

Abraham was arrested by the Portuguese in 1558. He escaped from their captivity in Mozambique and met Patriarch Abdisho IV in Gazarta, where he converted to Catholicism. The Chaldean patriarch appointed him as the Archbishop of Angamaly with papal confirmation and sent him to India with papal mandate. Meanwhile, the Portuguese had already arrested and deported Yawsep twice in 1562 and 1567 accusing him of being a 'Nestorian heretic' and was declared innocent each time by the pope. The pope suggested the patriarch to divide the Indian archdiocese between Yawsep and Abraham. However, this could not be materialized as Yawsep died in Rome in 1569. Francisco Dionysio reports in 1578 that Yawsep appointed two archdeacons, before being captured by the Portuguese, one each for the Northerners and for the Southerners. Giwargis was entrusted with the north and was also given the overall charge of the diocese as the person responsible for the south had already died. Kollaparambil gives two possible explanations for this incident. Perhaps the archdeacon appointed by Abraham was accommodated in charge of the southern region by Yawsep. Otherwise, the two archdeacons may be associated with the Northists and Southists ethnic factions. Perczel favours the latter explanation for Dionysio's account.

==== Archdeacon under Mar Abraham (1567 - 1584) ====
On arrival, Portuguese arrested and detained Abraham in Goa, from where he escaped to Malabar and settled in the interior settlement of Angamaly. Abraham had also recommended to the Chaldean patriarch that Giwargis, the archdeacon of Mar Yawsep, be appointed as his suffragan bishop. Abraham administered the church in Angamaly along with Giwargis, who was appointed accordingly as 'Bishop of Palur' by the patriarch. The patriarch also gave Abraham the permission to consecrate Giwargis as a bishop. Around this time, an orthodox East Syriac bishop named Mar Simeon arrived in Malabar. Simeon managed to obtain the support of Archdeacon Yaqov who was based in the Vatakkumkūr Kingdom. This became a crisis for Abraham and to gain the support of the Portuguese, he was forced to outwardly implement their policies. Yielding to their insistence, Abraham convened a Synod in Angamaly as suggested by Alexandro Valignano in 1583.

Mar Abraham tried to preserve the East Syriac rite he had practiced to the extent as possible. The Portuguese, who were aware of Abraham's unwavering allegiance to the East Syriac Rite, never really trusted him. As they did not know the Syriac language, they were unable to ascertain whether he was implementing the changes they had proposed. Meanwhile, Giwargis was already an expert in Classical Syriac 'as if it were his mother-tongue', according to Fransisco Dionysio. The Portuguese saw in him the perfect candidate who could help them implement latinization in the Syro-Malabaric rite and whose consecration as co-adjutor bishop with succession rights could end the line of Chaldean bishops in Malabar. Giwargis had started to study Latin and was ready to say the Latin mass. The Portuguese therefore, repeatedly persuaded Giwargis to accept episcopacy. However, Giwargis repeatedly refused to accept episcopal rank. In 1575, Giwargis founded the Cheriapalli in Angamaly dedicated to St. Mary (of Assumption) as the seat of the Archdeaconate while the older Valiyapalli remained as the parish church for the local Christians. In 1580, papal endorsement was given for Giwargis' episcopal consecration, in response to the request of the Jesuits. However the consecration did not happen till 1584, when Abraham wrote a letter requesting the pope to grant confirmation for Giwargis' consecration.

Francisco Dionysio writes in 1578 that although Giwargis honoured the episcopal rank, he was not willing to accept it due to his humility, instead wishing to remain a humble servant of the Archbishop. Meanwhile, Francisco Roz, who later emerged as Abraham's main opponent, claims in 1622 that Abraham never really wanted to consecrate Giwargis. However, Perczel notes that it was originally Abraham's idea to consecrate Giwargis to resist the Portuguese pressure. The Portuguese, having forged a cordial relationship with Giwargis, later took up the plan. It is possible that Abraham continued to postpone Giwargis' consecration, considering his growing friendship with the Portuguese who were overtly enthusiastic to have the consecration done. Kollaparambil finds Roz's accusation strange, because Dionysio's letter in 1578 makes it clear that Giwargis refused episcopal rank out of modesty despite the Portuguese having repeatedly tried to persuade him.

=== Archdeacon Lona (John) ===
Cassanar Lona is recorded as an archdeacon who contributed to the expenses of rebuilding the Vapicotta Church in a unique Portuguese report. The church in Vapicotta was arsoned by the Muslims during a sectarian conflict with the Christians in 1584. The conflict was triggered by the protest of Christians against the extension of certain privileges, which were until then exclusively enjoyed by the Christians, to the Muslims by the King of Paravur. The identity of Lona is unclear, as there is no mention of him in any other document. The name 'Lona' is a Syro-Malabaric adaptation of the Syriac name 'Yohannan' (John). Kollaparambil identifies Lona with Cassanar John, the son of Giwargis of Christ's brother. John was recommended by the Portuguese to be appointed as Giwargis' archdeacon when Giwargis would succeed Mar Abraham as the next metropolitan of Angamaly. As Abraham outlived Giwargis, he may have appointed Giwargis' nephew John as his archdeacon, in accordance with the line of dynastic succession. However, it is not possible to determine the exact period of his reign as the exact year of the death of Giwargis of Christ is not documented. There is no mention of Giwargis of Christ in the historical records after 1584. It is recorded that a vacancy for the archdeaconate occurred in 1591. Therefore, Giwargis of Christ may have died by 1585 or 1591. Meanwhile, Giwargis of the Cross was appointed as archdeacon in 1593. Evaluating these information, Kollaparambil suggests that Lona's term may have been from 1585 to 1591 or from 1591 to 1593. The Portuguese claimed that Mar Abraham had appointed archdeacons circumventing their seniority so that they would support him in his conflict with the Portuguese. This makes it more probable that Lona's term ended in 1591.

== Giwargis of Cross ==
=== Under Mar Abraham (1593-1597) ===
Giwargis of Cross was archdeacon from 1593 to 1637. He was another nephew of Giwargis of Christ and was from Kuravilangad. According to Antonio de Gouvea, a priest named Thoma Curia of Angamaly had a greater claim to the position of archdeacon. Gouvea adds that Giwargis was appointed archdeacon, despite his young age, as he supported Mar Abraham against the Portuguese. In 1594, Abraham submitted a petition to the Pope requesting that Giwargis be declared his co-adjutor and successor. During this period, Mar Abraham and Giwargis had improved their relations with the Jesuits and began to cooperate with them. Giwargis also began studying Syriac under Francisco Roz. At Roz's suggestion, Giwargis was ready to reject orthodox East Syriac theology and instead preach Roman Catholic theology. In 1595, Abraham, who was seriously ill, made a testament declaring Giwargis as the administrator of the archdiocese in his absence. Abraham prepared to consecrate Geevarghese using the authority bestowed upon him by the Chaldean Patriarch, but the Jesuits prevented him from doing so, insisting that the Pope's confirmation was required. Abraham had sought the help of the Jesuits to obtain confirmation from the Pope for his episcopal consecration, but he did not receive such confirmation until his death in 1597. After the death of Mar Abraham, Giwargis took over the administration of the church as per the late metropolitan's will and established tradition.

=== Activities of Alexis Menezis (1597-1600) ===
==== Conflict with Alexis Menezis ====
Immediately after hearing the news of Mar Abraham's death, Alexis Menezes, the then Padroado Archbishop of Goa, appointed Francisco Roz as the Apostolic vicar of Angamaly, claiming that he had received special faculty from the Pope. Church scholars dispute whether Menezis had actually received such authority from the Pope. Neither the archdeacon nor the native Christians were willing to accept Menesis' decision. Following this, Menezes had to revise his order twice ultimately recognizing the archdeacon as the administrator of the archdiocese. However, Menezes asked the archdeacon to take a profession of faith in front of the rector of the Jesuit Seminary of Vaipicotta. By this time, the archdeacon's relationship with the Jesuits was severely deteriorated as he had a strong suspicion that the Jesuits were trying to reduce the Saint Thomas Christians under their hegemony. The archdeacon replied that he had the canonical right to administer the Angamaly Archdiocese, even without Menezes' approval. He later convoked a synod of priests in Angamaly, in which the priests took a solemn oath that they would only recognize the Archdeacon of Angamaly as their administrator, until the Chaldean Patriarch appoints a new metropolitan for them.

==== Attempts for compromise with Menezis ====
Angered by the resistance of the native Christians, Menezes wrote to the archdeacon that he intends to a visit Malabar. The archdeacon, fearing an imminent schism that such a visit would cause in the community, replied that he was ready to perform the profession of faith to the Franciscans, but not to the Jesuits. The archdeacon initially made a private profession of faith in front of the Franciscans but this did not satisfy Menezis. Therefore he made a public profession of faith in the Franciscan Church of Vypin, in front of the Portuguese civil authorities and the representatives of all the religious orders, except the Jesuits. The Dominicans testified that they were completely satisfied with the archdeacon's profession of faith. But the Jesuits did not end their hostility towards the archdeacon and instead claimed that he was a heretic. This allegation is echoed in the accounts of Jorge de Crasto, the founder of the Vaipicotta Seminary, and Menezis and Gouvea. Meanwhile, Francisco Roz and Estavo de Britto were of the opinion that the archdeacon was a devout Catholic.

==== Menezis' journey to Malabar ====
Although the archdeacon tried his best to prevent Menezis' visit to Malabar, Menezis was determined to undertake a visit to all the churches of the Saint Thomas Christians, taking advantage of the vacancy of the bishopric. Realizing that such a visit was imminent, the archdeacon called a meeting of the parish representatives. It was decided that Menezis should be received only as a guest and that he should be allowed to perform only spiritual ceremonies. Menezis initially agreed to refrain from administrative matters. But he was quick to conveniently break this agreement. He used various tactics to increase his support, including giving out numerous priestly ordinations without the concurrence of the archdeacon, and giving gold, money and gifts to kings, local chieftains and other influential people. The visit, having started in February 1599, lasted for a few months and slowly earned the support of many parishes, especially the Southist ones. After having won over a considerable number of people and priests, Menezes threatened to depose the archdeacon and appoint in his stead Thoma Curia, the other nephew of the former archdeacon whose claims had been ignored in 1593. In order to prevent a schism, the archdeacon yielded to the demands of Menezes.

==== Menezis' Synod of Diamper ====
Menezis then resorted to convene a diocesan synod to suppress the jurisdiction of Chaldean patriarch in Malabar and to formally bring the Saint Thomas Christians under the Portuguese Padroado. Although the archdeacon assured him of his cooperation in this, Menezis decided to avoid Angamaly, which was the episcopal see, as it was a native Christian stronghold where the archdeacon was more influential. Hence, he selected Udayamperoor (Diamper), a town with a larger Southist presence located within the realms of the Kingdom of Cochin, who was an ally of the Portuguese. There, he promulgated his pre-determined canons by consolidating support from those whom he offered ordinations and bribes during his visit. The archdeacon reluctantly offered his submission and agreed to terminate the hierarchical relationship with the Chaldean patriarchate. Menezis recognised the archdeacon as the governor of the 'diocese of Angamaly', the newly formed suffragan diocese of the Goan Padroado archdiocese created by Menezis' synod to replace the Chaldean archdiocese, for the time being until the appointment of a new prelate.

=== Under Francisco Roz (1600-1624) ===
After the return of Menezis to Goa, Francisco Roz and Giovanni Campori visited many of the churches left out by Menezis and the archdeacon was forced to accompany them. Roz indulged into the correction and destruction of orthodox East Syriac manuscripts under the possession of the parishes. Roz was appointed as the first bishop of the newly formed suffragan diocese of Angamaly. Being a Syriac scholar and highly experienced in working among the Christians of Malabar, Roz managed to secure his position among the Christians during their intense dissatisfaction against Menezis' Synod of Diamper by declaring it a false synod and by appealing for the restoration of the metropolitan status for the diocese. With the concurrence of the archdeacon in 1603, Roz convened a new synod in Angamaly, which enacted a revised form of the Syro-Malabaric liturgy and a new set of diocesan statutes, thereby replacing those of the Synod of Diamper. However Roz's tendency to centralize power unto himself frequently brought him at odds with the archdeacon.

==== Conflict with Roz ====
By 1604, Roz had shifted the diocesan headquarters from Angamaly to Cranganore, causing distaste in the archdeacon. This and his subsequent actions based in Cranganore also triggered his disputes with the Diocese of Cochin and the Franciscans. The publication of the Jornada of Menezis which attributed the Saint Thomas Christians of heresy intensified the dissatisfaction among the native Christians. Meanwhile, the archdeacon renewed strong ties with the Franciscans, who were at odds with the Jesuits.

In 1609, the dispute between Roz and the archdeacon turned into an open explosion. The archdeacon welcomed a West Asian whom he hailed as a bishop sent by the Chaldean patriarch. After eight months of stay, he returned to his homeland in Armenia with the help of the archdeacon. Roz responded by excommunicating the archdeacon and his supporters. The archdeacon, however, maintained strong adherence from the majority of the Christians and was supported by the political and ecclesiastical authorities in Cochin and the Franciscans. Meanwhile, Roz appointed a new archdeacon to invest him with the Pallium that was granted as the metropolitan status of the diocese was restored. The new archdeacon was from Kaduthuruthy and is said to be one of Giwargis' own uncles. By 1615, Roz and Giwargis had temporarily sorted out their problems only to be resumed by 1618. Roz started disregarding the archdeacon and the archdeacon responded by banning Jesuits from entering the churches under him. Estevao Brito and Giacomo Fenicio favoured the archdeacon while Campori tried to make the disputes even worse. Roz died in 1624 without having solved the disputes with the archdeacon. Following this, the archdeacon took over the administration of the archdiocese along with the Jesuit Antoney Toscano as per the will left by Roz himself.

=== Under Estevao Brito (1624 - 1637) ===
==== Accommodation with Brito ====
Estevao Brito was appointed archbishop of Cranganore in 1624. His relationship with the archdeacon was already very cordial. Brito was solemnly received and accepted by the archdeacon. The Portuguese king, on Brito's recommendation, had bestowed the Order of Christ on the archdeacon, but he refused to accept it fearing that such Portuguese innovations may degrade his traditional status and rights. The archdeacon collaborated with Brito in governance. Brito founded the 'Recollects of Saint Thomas the Apostle', a religious order for the native Christian priests, centred in Edappally (Rapolim).

==== Renewed conflicts with Jesuits ====
Meanwhile, the relationship between the archdeacon and the Jesuits continued to deteriorate. The Jesuits claimed monopoly over the Saint Thomas Christians and opposed the presence of other religious orders. Meanwhile, the archdeacon welcomed the Dominicans led by Francisco Donati, who established a seminary in Kaduthuruthy for the natives. The archdeacon also reached out to the Augustinians to request the Portuguese King to allow non-Jesuit missionaries in Malabar and to confirm the Recollects. Brito was heavily displeased by these actions of the archdeacon. In 1633, the pope permitted all religious orders to work in India. But this approval was not accepted by the Portuguese authorities. The Jesuits feared that the archdeacon could oust them from Malabar if the native Recollects obtain papal confirmation. Being instigated by the Jesuits, Brito planned to dissolve the Recollects and prevented new members from joining it. He also attempted to excommunicate those who joined the Recollects without his permission. In 1633, he amended the rules of the Recollects to make it less appear like a religious congregation, contrary to what he initially intended it to be.

==== Conflict and settlement with Brito ====
The Recollects, led by the archdeacon, protested against the Jesuits and tried to resolve the issue in Brito's audience, which he refused. This led to an open conflict between the archdeacon and Brito. The archdeacon reciprocated by forbidding Jesuits from entering native churches and preventing the sending of candidates to the Vaipicotta Seminary, and refused to recognise the appointments made by Brito without his concurrence. The following week, Britto reached an agreement with the archdeacon and acknowledged his rights in document. By then, the Portuguese Viceroy had instructed the captain in Cochin to capture and kill the archdeacon if requested by Brito. The captain bribed the King of Cochin and tried to seize the document issued by Brito to the archdeacon. The King of Cochin ordered the archdeacon to produce the document, but the archdeacon submitted a copy instead of the original. Meanwhile, the archdeacon assigned Manoel Popolo to communicate directly with the Portuguese king. The Portuguese king limited Brito's powers in response to the archdeacon's complaints. Meanwhile, the Jesuits had already managed to get Francisco Garcia Mendes as Brito's coadjutor and future successor. Following these developments, the archbishop and the archdeacon finally reconciled by 1635.

=== Death ===
There are two versions regarding the death of Archdeacon Giwargis of the Cross. The first is that he died in 1637 and was buried at his ancestral home in Kuravilangad. He was then immediately succeeded by his nephew, Parambil Thoma. The second, supported by a Syriac epitaph in the Angamaly Cheriyapalli Church, says that he died on 25 July 1640 and was buried in the Cheriyapalli, the seat of the archdeaconate, in Angamaly.

== Thoma Parampil ==
=== Conflict with Garcia ===
Thoma Parampil was appointed archdeacon following the death of Giwargis of Cross either in 1637 or 1640 by Estevao Brito. He was Giwargis' sister's son hailing from the house of Parampil based in Kuravilangad. Thoma's tenure witnessed the death of Brito in 1941 and the immediate elevation of Francisco Garcia Mendes as Brito's successor. Garcia had been repulsive to the rights of the archdeacon since his tenure as the co-adjutor of Brito. Garcia consistently disregarded the agreement made between his predecessor and Archdeacon Giwargis. For this reason, disputes began between Garcia and Thoma from the very beginning.

By 1645, the archdeacon formed a front against Garcia, with the support of the Recollects of Edappally. In December of that year, Kadavil Chandy, an experienced writer among the supporters of the archdeacon, presented the Portuguese Viceroy Filipe Mascarenhas in Kochi a letter of complaint against Garcia. Thoma showed the Viceroy the document of settlement reached between the former Archbishop and Archdeacon. Bishop Michael Rangel of Cochin supported the demands of the archdeacon and proposed that the dioceses of Cochin and Cranganore could be merged. He also vouched for an end of Jesuit monopoly over the Malabar Christians as decreed by the pope. He described the native Christians as those "trampled under foot, crying for many years for preachers from all religious orders, and for a better education of their native clergy".

Meanwhile, Garcia and the Jesuits had begun moves against the archdeacon. They accused the archdeacon of secessionist activities against the archbishop, in the kingdoms of Mangat and Vatakkumkūr, and misappropriation of funds of the Cathedral of Angamaly and Church of Kuravilangad. Following this, a compromise was signed between the two at the compulsion of the viceroy. It recommended the archbishop to seek the archdeacon's concurrence in administrative acts, but the archbishop was empowered to exclude the archdeacon whenever he wanted to. The viceroy's settlement, as expected by the viceroy himself, could not end the dispute. Garcia replaced the vicars of Diamper and Kottayam without the archdeacon's concurrence. The appointment of vicars of Anjicaimal and Vaipicotta Churches were already a point of contention for the archdeacon. The archdeacon accused the archbishop of not complying with the settlement, while the archbishop retaliated by accusing him of deceiving the faithful by forging a fake translation of the document. In fact, the archdeacon's version of the concord closely resembled that of Brito's grant and omitted the restrictive clauses in support of the archbishop. Hyacinth Magistris, Secretary of Garcia, started visiting the native churches and implementing harsh penalties against the archdeacon's supporters. The archdeacon expressed his willingness for reconciliation with the archbishop. Garcia put forward two conditions: first that the agreement between the former archbishop and the archdeacon be surrendered to him and that a true translation of the new agreement be made and submitted to him without omitting the provisions favorable to the archbishop. The archdeacon did not agree with either of his conditions.

==== Complete Fall Out ====
After attempts at reconciliation between the two failed, the archdeacon went to the parishes in the South and passed resolutions against the archbishop. Those parishes decided not to accept vicars appointed by the Archbishop and instead decided to accept vicars from their proximity. By this time, Garcia already began implementing his arbitrary appointments in churches in the north. Therefore, the archdeacon tried to reach a compromise with the Archbishop again, but Garcia was not willing to budge even a little. Garcia ignored the traditional role of the archdeacon by appointing Jerome Furtado as his vicar general. Roz and Brito, even when they were in conflict with the archdeacon, had always recognized him as their ex-officio vicar general as mandated by the diocesan synod of 1603 and the Rozian Statutes of 1606. The monastic orders like the Dominicans and Carmelites began to support the Archdeacon. Through them, the Archdeacon submitted complaints to the Pope. However, none of these letters were answered. The archdeacon, who had been waiting for answers, chose to remain silent without causing any further problems. Meanwhile, Portuguese King decided in favour of Garcia in 1647, causing the King of Cochin to shift his favour from the archdeacon to the archbishop. By 1649, without Garcia's permission, Thoma moved to the Kingdom of Edappally and became a member of the Recollects. Having apparently cornered the archdeacon, Garcia initiated judicial steps to excommunicate him. Although the archdeacon continued to try to reach a compromise with Garcia, Garcia was not ready to make any compromise in his previous conditions. Garcia placed the two churches of Edappally, which housed the archdeacon, under interdict.

In December, 1649, the archdeacon sought the help of Carmelite friar Joseph Alexis, the founder of a chapel and confraternity in Kuravilangad, to sent letters to the pope. But these did not reach before 1655. Meanwhile, the archdeacon also wrote letters addressed to the patriarchs of the Oriental Churches, the Coptic Patriarch in Cairo and possibly also to the Jacobite and Chaldean Patriarchs. Nothing is known about the fate of the letters sent to the latter two. However, the Coptic Patriarch, who took an active interest in it, showed the letter to Elzeario Sansay, a French Capuchin intermediating a proposed union between the Coptic church and Rome. Sansay proposed to the Propaganda Fide the sending of Andreas Abdegalis, a Catholic convert from the Jacobite church in Aleppo, to Malabar. As there was no response from Rome, the Coptic Patriarch recommended the opportunity to a Jacobite metropolitan from Damascus who was then living in Cairo and had recently converted to Catholicism. It was Cyril Atallah Ibn Issa, one of the most notable figures in the later history of the Saint Thomas Christianity.

=== Revolution ===
By 1652, a facade of silence and peace had spread throughout the Malabar Church. Garcia and the Jesuits interpreted it as a defeat of the archdeacon. But beneath the apparent calm lurked an explosive anguish of the natives against the tyranny of the Padroado archbishop and the Jesuits. Garcia's supporters warned him every now and then that an arrival of an oriental bishop could be disastrous for him. The archdeacon knew that his attempts to seek protection for his traditional rights were going in vain. His complaints to Rome and Lisbon were being intercepted by Garcia's agents. In case if some reach their destinations, the Jesuits would block any reciprocation in his favour. Even if he gets a favourable order, Garcia would certainly impede its implementation. The Jesuits were determined in extinguishing any autonomy left with the native Christians. They argued that the Synod of Diamper has effectively ended the legacy of the Chaldean jurisdiction and the traditional practice of the archdeaconate was an abuse to be corrected. Garcia wrote:

Having bishops from Babylon, they can live as they want and the Archdeacon, whom they consider their head, can be the principal ruler, which is not possible having an Archbishop from Rome.

==== Ahatallah in India ====
Ahatallah, who received the commission from the Coptic Patriarch, departed for India. Ahattalla arrived at the port of Surat in the guise of an ordinary Christian monk and from there boarded a Dutch ship, bypassing Goa and Kochi, and disembarked in Madras. On August 23, he approached the Capuchins for help but they detained him and handed him over to the Jesuits in Mylapore. The Jesuits, suspicious of Ahatalla's clerical credentials, detained him. Meanwhile, three Mar Thoma Christian priests, namely George Kuriath Parampil of Kuravilangad, Zacharias Itti from Chengannur and Zacharias Cherian Unni from Ambazhakkad, and a layman, named George Kuruvila Perical, who had arrived in Mylapore from Malabar on pilgrimage met him. As they were leaving, they were given a letter addressed to the leaders of the Marthoma Christians.

In Mylapore, he introduced himself as 'Ignatius, 'Patriarch of All India and China'. He also claimed that he had arrived with full authority from the Pope.

==== Archdeacon takes up the cause ====
The news about the oriental prelate made the native Christians excited. They met in Udayamperoor and discussed their further steps. They wrote to Garcia seeking his co-operation in bringing him to Malabar. Garcia declared that "even if the Patriarch were sent by the Supreme Pontiff, we cannot grant him to you, for he has not brought the beneplacet of our King." The enraged archdeacon and his supporters argued that Garcia should be immediately replaced by Ahatallah. But others felt that it would be better for Ahatallah to take over after Garcia's death. They decided to reassemble in Mattancherry to discuss further steps. Kadavil Chandy went to meet Garcia and informed him about the anguish his reply has caused among them, but they returned insulted. Garcia challenged them that if his subjects rebelled, he knew how to tame them and all the money he might spend for that purpose would later be recouped from them.

==== Ahatallah Incident ====
Soon, Marcel de Leyva, the rector of the Jesuit College in Mylapore, secretly wrote to the Garcia about Ahatalla's activities and, on their instructions, sent him to Cochin. Immediately upon learning of this, Archdeacon Thomas arrived in Kochi with his supporters. There, the Archdeacon sought permission from the civil and ecclesiastical authorities there to see Ahatalla on his arrival and examine his credentials. The Portuguese authorities in Cochin were initially sympathetic to their pleas. However they later refused, at the influence of Garcia and other Jesuit hardliners, who declared: "Don't worry, we won't lose the Serra, for willy-nilly they have to come to their true prelate for the holy Orders". Although Captain Antonio Meneses had initially allowed the archdeacon and eight priests to inspect the prelate's credentials, he withdrew the offer and did not allow even Archdeacon to board the ship. They replied to the archdeacon that no such bishop could be legally appointed to India without the Portuguese's approval, and that Ahatallah was a treacherous Nestorian monk. After two days, they informed the archdeacon that Ahatalla had already been sent to Goa for Inquisition. The archdeacon had been escorted by priests and many armed men to Mattancherry. To prevent a possible attack on the Portuguese and Jesuits by the native Christians, they spread the story that the unfortunate Ahatalla had accidentally drowned in the sea. This lie, told by the Portuguese to calm the people, actually angered them. They thought that Ahatalla was drowned in the Cochin Sea by the Portuguese.

==== Coonan Cross Oath ====
After the news of Ahatalla's death spread, representatives of the native Christians gathered at the Church of the Virgin Mary in Mattancherry on January 3, 1653. They called on Garcia, who was then in Cochin, to arrive and address their grievance within a day. Garcia not only ignored this, but was not prepared to budge. Consequently they vowed that they would never recognise Garcia as their prelate or subject themselves to the Portuguese Jesuits (Paulists). With this act, independence from Padroado rule was declared. Their leaders later met at the Edappally church. When informed of the oath, Garcia reportedly said: "They espoused me to a black spouse, but if she doesn't want me, and repudiates me, frankly I don't care; the devil can take her."

==== 'Consecration' of Thoma ====
The archdeacon and his supporters met again at Edappally on February 5, coinciding with this was the three-day fast celebration which attracted a large crowd. Anjilimoottil Ittithomman, one of the major supporters of the archdeacon, produced two more letters claiming to have been written by Ahatallah. The last letter described a ceremony for the consecration of a bishop by twelve priests. They therefore decided to elevate Archdeacon Thomas to the position of Metropolitan, which they had previously thought would be held by Ahatalla.

However, these two letters are most likely not authentic and may even be forgeries fabricated by Itti Thomman himself as later testified by George Parampil. Some were skeptical about this strange ceremony, but enthusiasm regarding Ahatallah's letters and anguish against the Portuguese ensured that the ceremonies would proceed as planned. Accordingly, they again met on May 22, 1653 in Alangad. One of the letters, allegedly from Ahatalla, was placed on the head of Archdeacon Thoma, and the twelve priests performed the consecration using an old East Syriac ritual text. Only a few people and two Southist churches, namely Kaduthuruthy and Udayamperoor, objected this. Thoma began ordaining clerics within a few weeks of the ceremony. Garcia realized he had lost his leverage and started bribing the local kings. These efforts were successful only in the Kingdom of Parur, as the kingdoms like Kochi, Kaduthuruthy, Kottayam, and Purakad, were preoccupied in wars with each other.

=== Sebastiani's mission and schism ===
As the struggle between Portuguese Jesuits and the dissident native Christians reached a standstill, Rome sent a Carmelite priest named Giuseppe Sebastiani to Malabar in 1656. In 1661, Sebastiani was consecrated bishop and sent as Apostolic Commissary with faculties to consecrate Thoma as bishop, if the latter repents and submits. But Thoma could not come to terms with Sebastiani. Sebastiani, on the other hand, wanted to continue as bishop in Malabar. But with the Dutch conquest of the city of Cochin from the Portuguese, Sebastiani was forced to leave Malabar. On February 1, 1663, he consecrated Parampil Chandy, a cousin of Thoma and gave him the authority to exclude the Jesuits from Church and to engage with those who remained with Thoma. Simultaneously, Thoma and his close associates were declared excommunicated. This officiated the gradual schism of Saint Thomas Christians into one faction led by Thoma and another led by Chandy.

=== Thoma forging Jacobite ties ===
With Chandy canonically consecrated as a bishop, most of the churches originally under Thoma's control joined Chandy's side. With this, Thomas began to move to protect his power. He corresponded with the Jesuits who were based in Ambazhakad. These discussions stalled on the condition that he be prepared to stop claiming to be a bishop. But in the meantime, Gregorios Abdal Jalīl, a bishop sent by the Jacobite Patriarch in response to Thoma's letter arrived in Malabar. Thomas received him. Thoma and his supporters eventually entered into a new relationship with the Jacobite Patriarch of Antioch. Henceforth, Thoma and those who remained with him gradually asserted a Syriac Orthodox (Jacobite) identity and became known as Puttankūṯṯukāṟ (New Allegiance). Meanwhile, those who joined Chandy and retained their East Syriac Catholic (Chaldean) identity, came to be called Paḻayakūṯṯukāṟ (Old Allegiance).

== Gallery ==
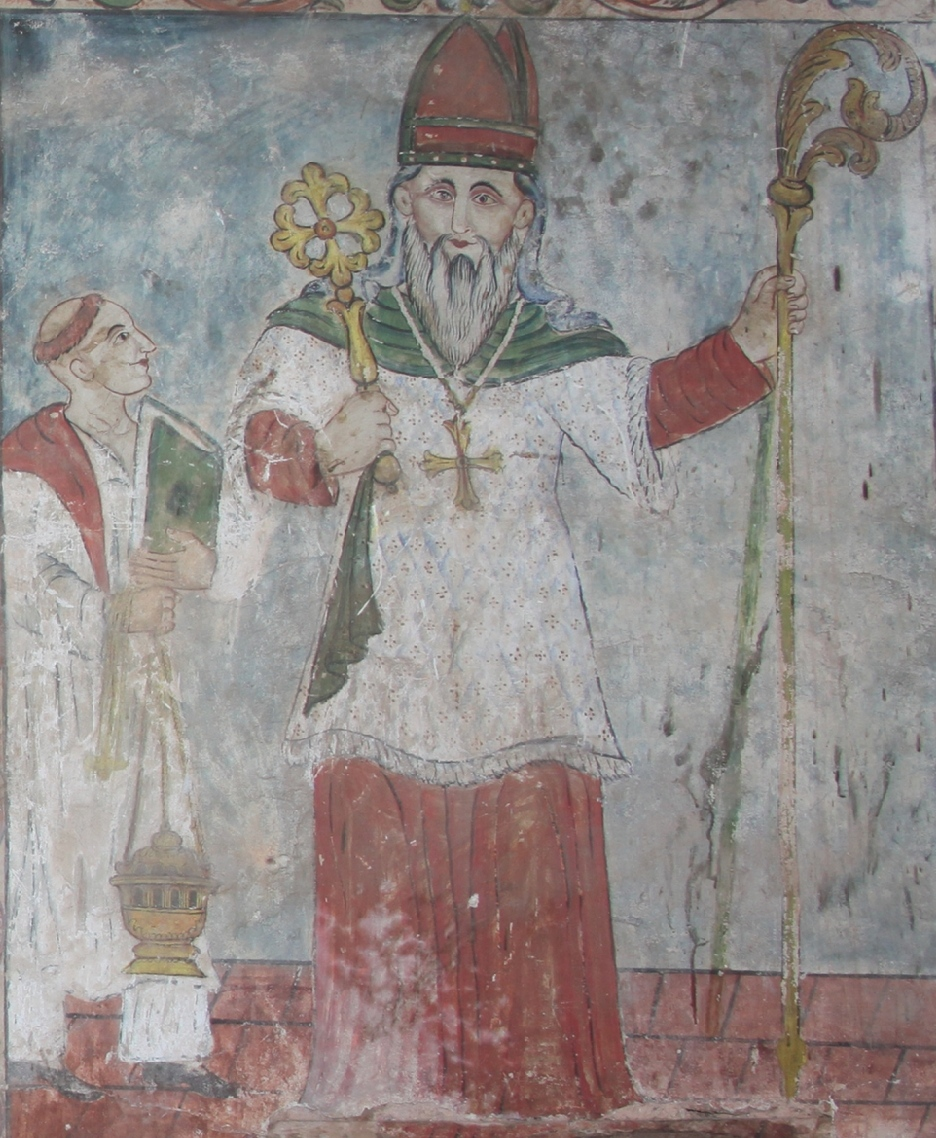
Mural supposed to be of the old Giwargis of Christ, vested in Latin Rite episcopal vestments carrying an East Syriac crosier and hand cross and being served by a deacon with a characteristic Latin tonsure, from the Angamaly Cheriya pally

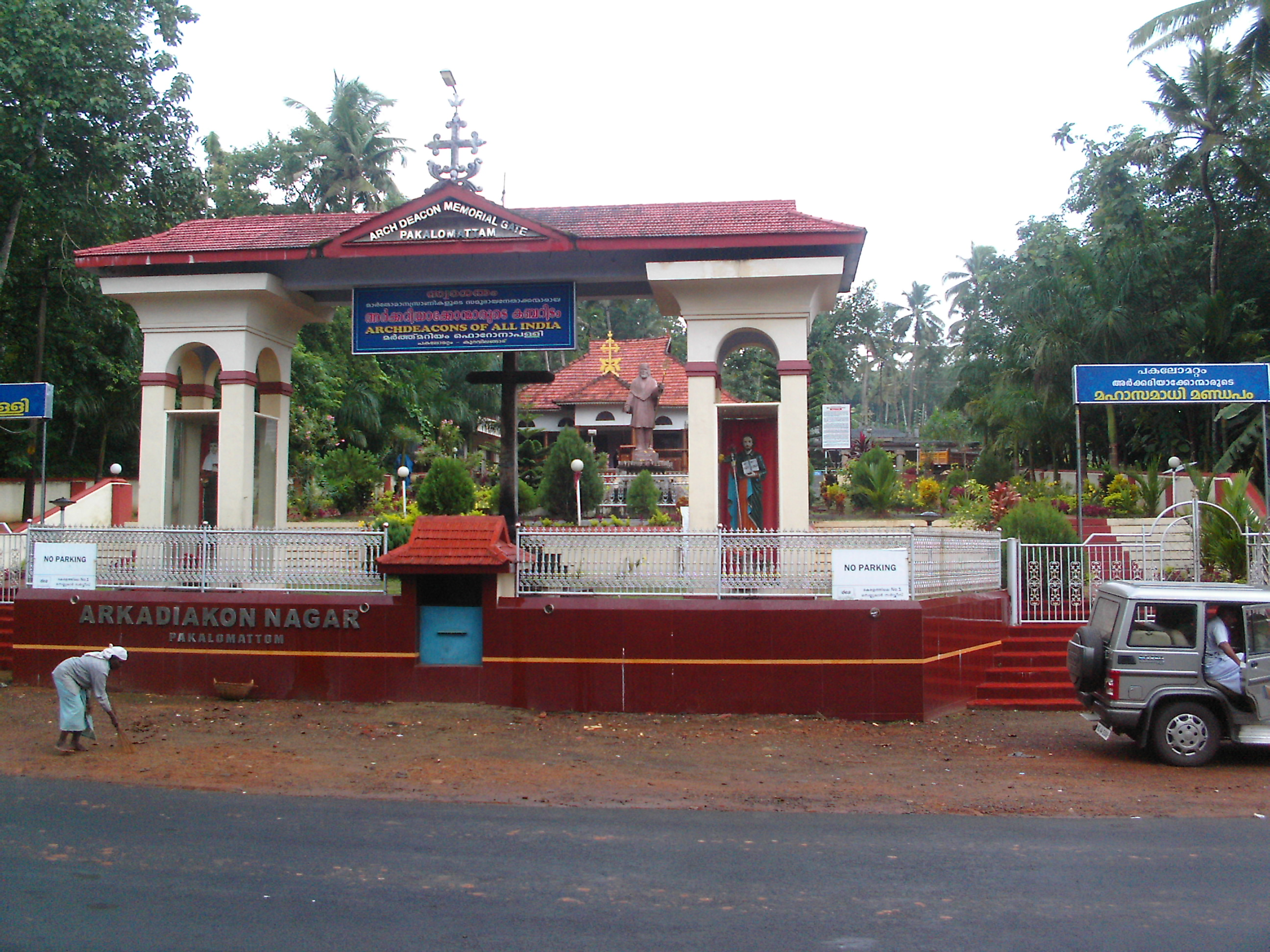
The Cemetery of the Archdeacons, Kuravilangad, Kerala

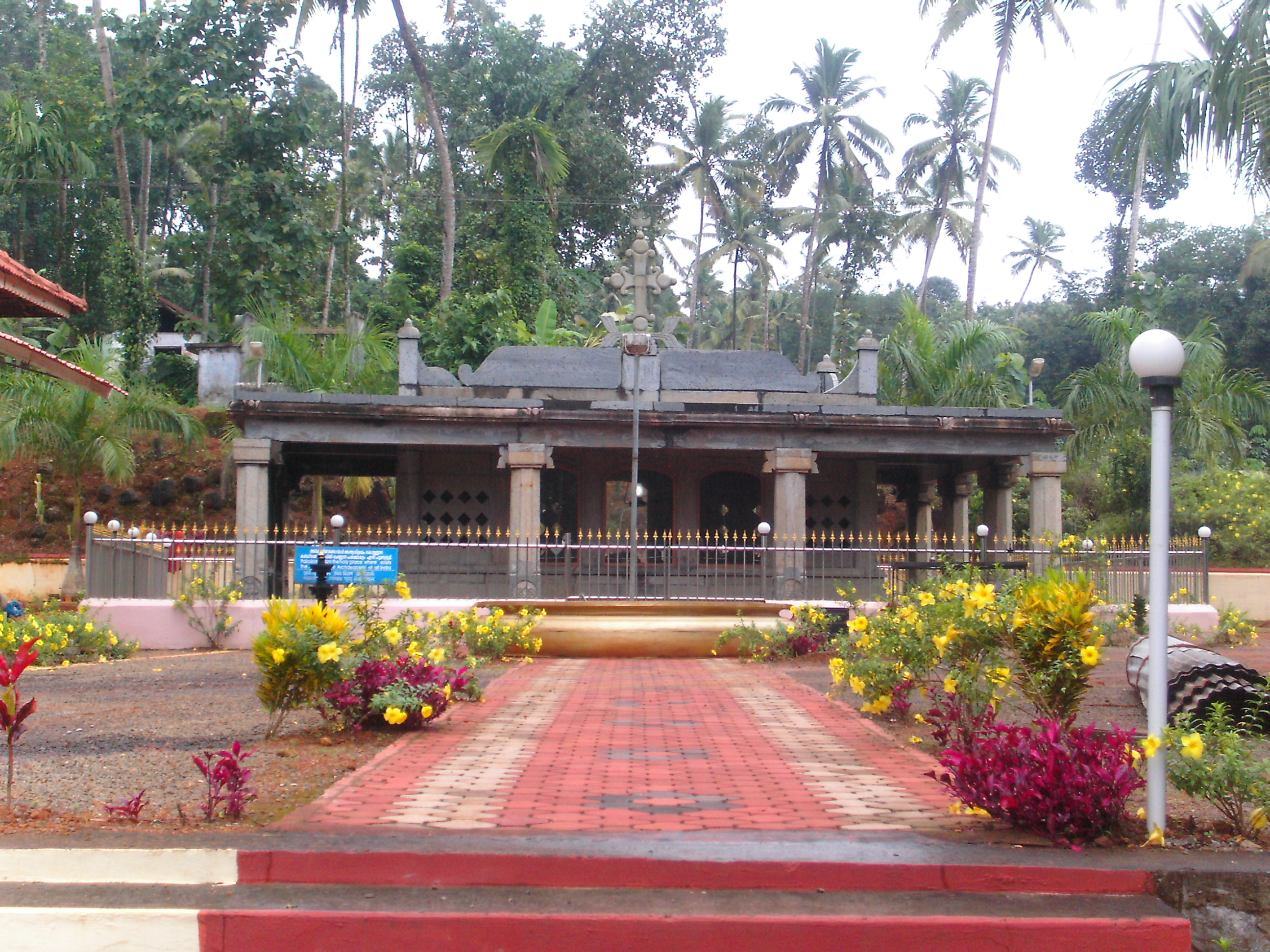
The mausoleum, which houses the ancient archdeacon tombs

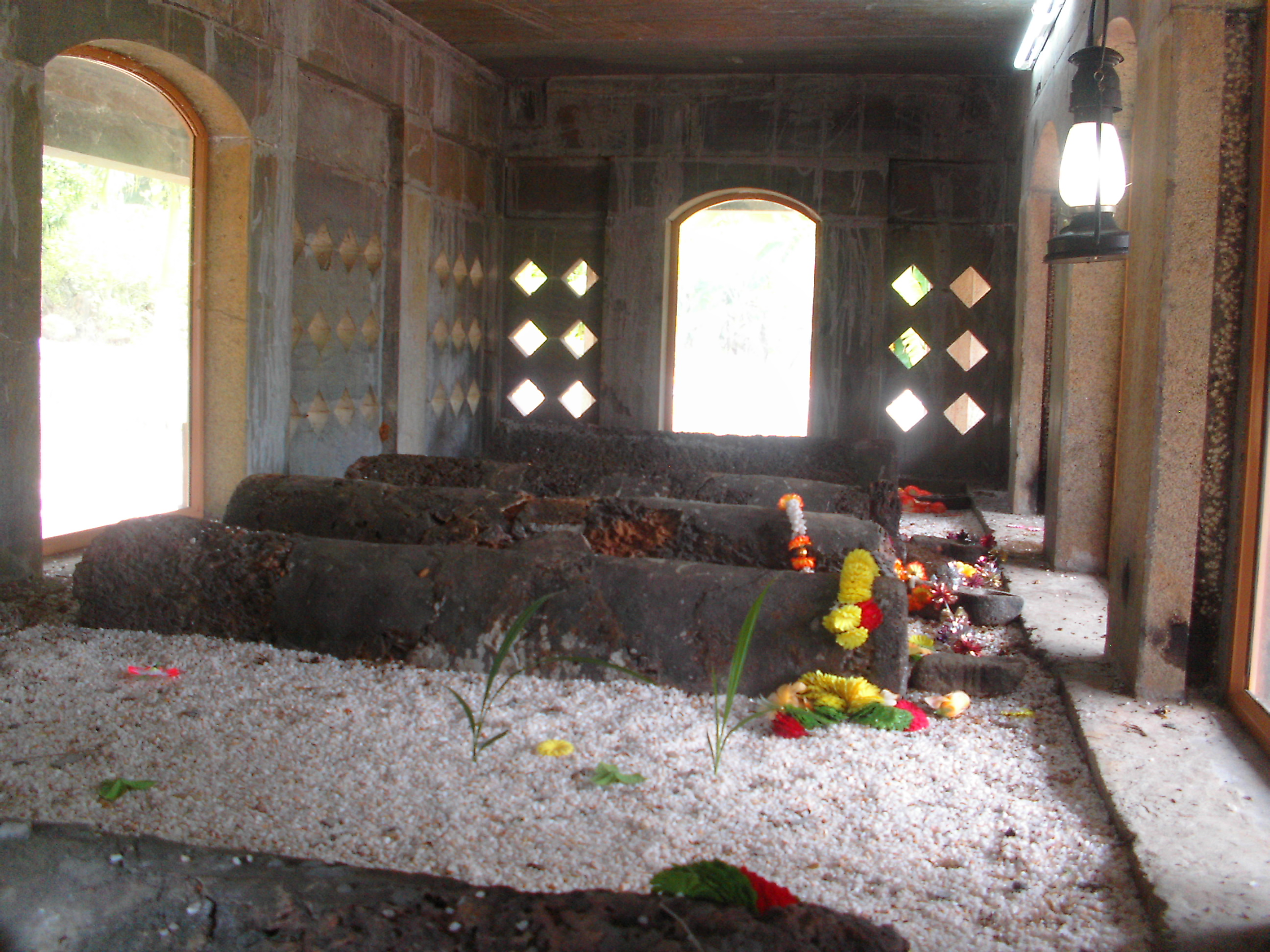
The old archdeacon tombs under the mausoleum

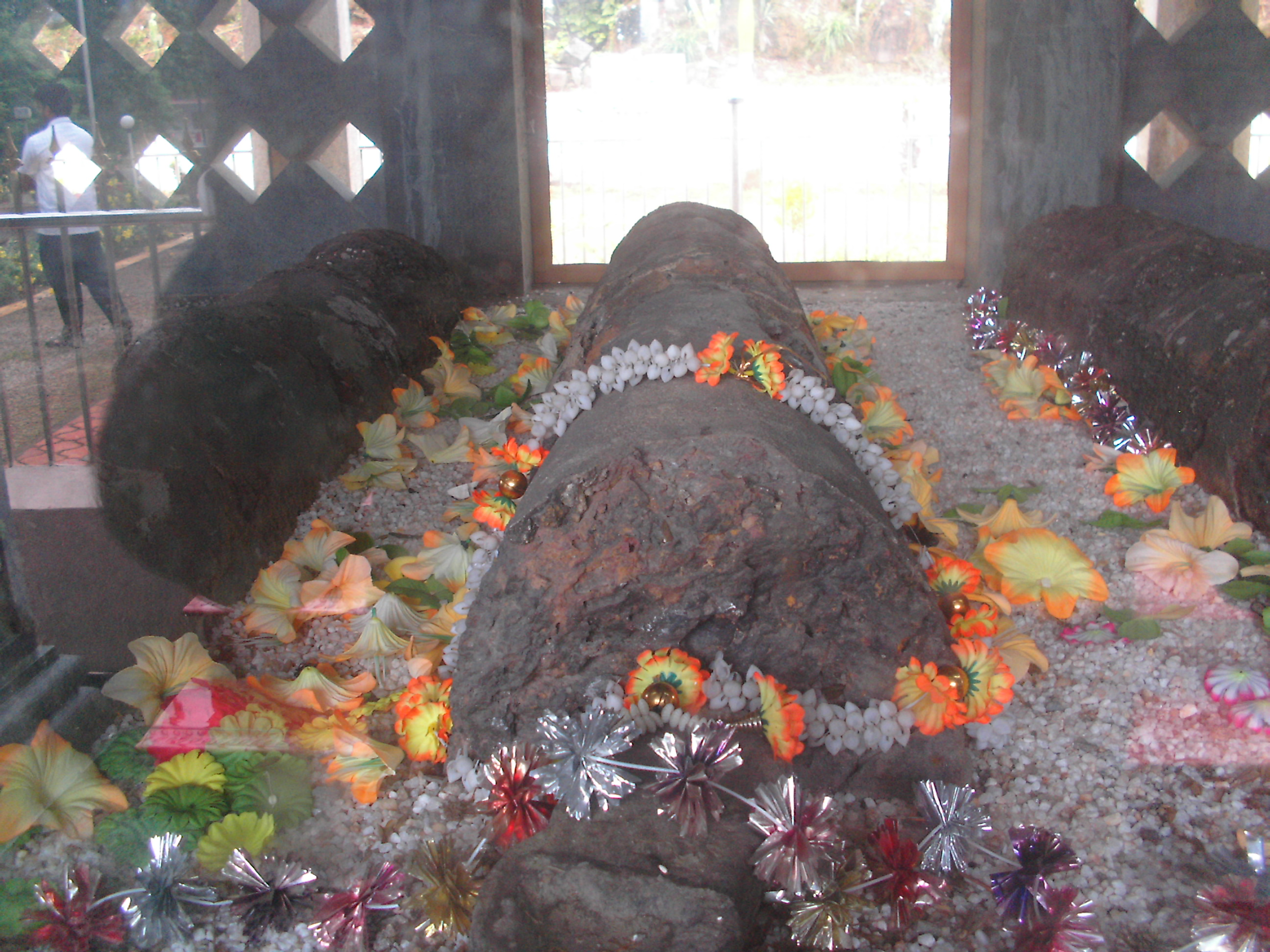
One of the graves from the mausoleum
