= St. Thomas Syro-Malabar Church, Palayur =

Palayur church

Palayoor Mar Thoma Major Archiepiscopal Church
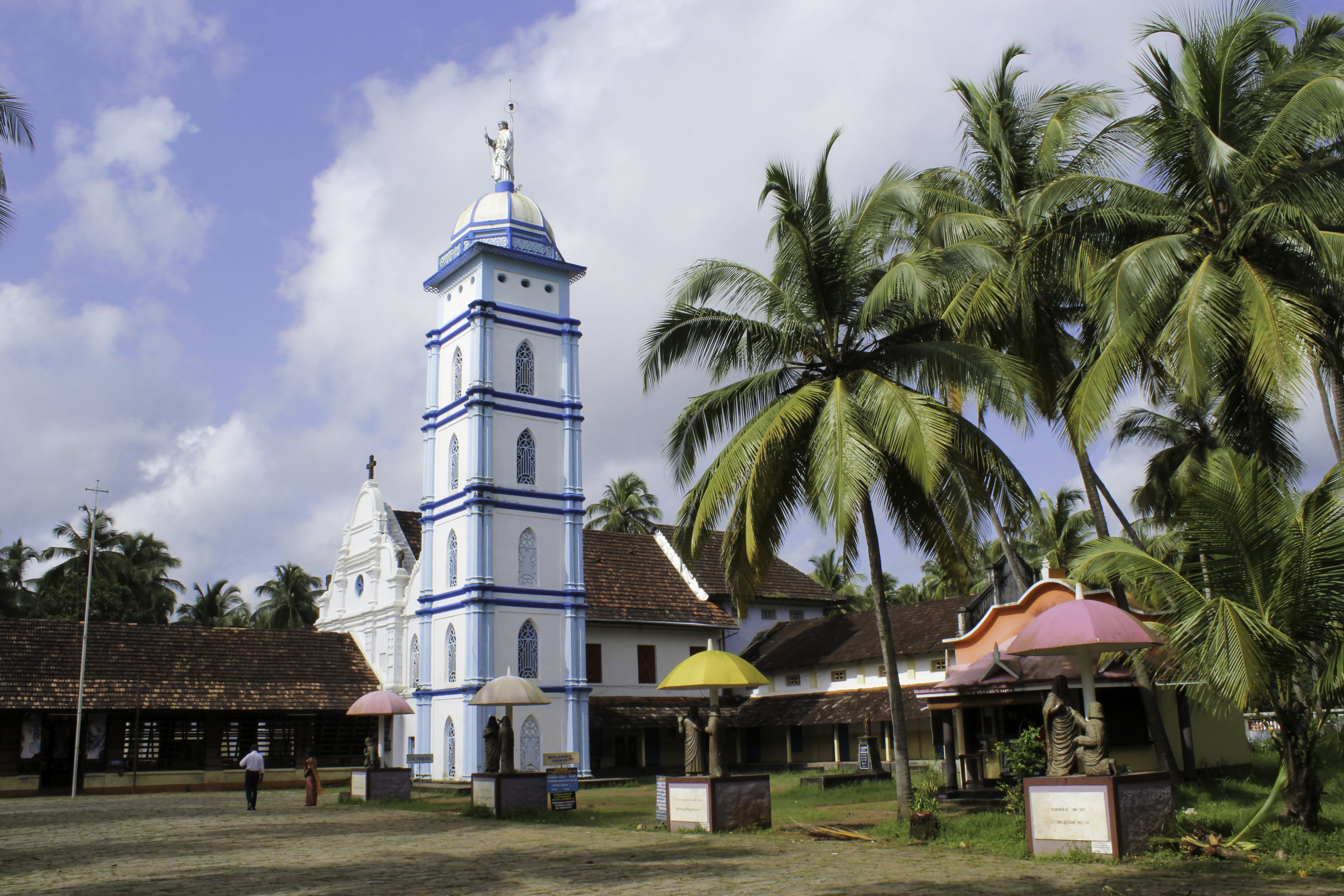
- St. Thomas Major archiepiscopal church at Palayur

Religion
- Affiliation: Syro-Malabar Church
- District: Thrissur
- Ecclesiastical or organisational status: Major archiepiscopal church

Location
- Location: Kerala India
- State: Kerala
- Interactive map of Palayoor Mar Thoma Major Archiepiscopal Church
- Coordinates: (10.5825°N 76.0319°E)

Architecture
- Architects: Thomas the Apostle by tradition. Rebuilt under Giacomo Fenicio (AD 1600-1607)
- Style: Blend of Kerala, Persian, and Portuguese architecture

Specifications
- Direction of façade: West
- Dome: 1
- Materials: Lime and Mortar

Website
- https://stthomaschurchpalayoor.com/

Palayur Mar Thoma Major Archiepiscopal Church, is located at Palayur (historically known as Palur), in Thrissur district in Kerala on the west coast of India. According to Saint Thomas Christian tradition, the Syrian church is believed to be established in 52 AD by St Thomas, one of the twelve apostles of Jesus Christ. Saint Thomas performed the first baptism in India here, therefore this church is called an Apostolic Church credited to the apostolate of St. Thomas, who preached and also introduced Christianity to the people here. It is part of the Ēḻarappaḷḷikaḷ (seven major churches) that he established in India, the others being at Cranganore, Kokkamangalam, Kottakkavu, Kollam, Niranam, Chayal (Nilackal). The original small church structure has been retained at the original site. But substantial improvements around it were carried out during the 17th century by Giacomo Fenicio as necessary, without sacrificing the main sanctity of the place. Currently the Archpriest is Fr. Davis Kannampuzha. The Custodian of the church is the Metropolitan Archbishop of Thrissur, Mar Andrews Thazhath.

== History ==
=== Legend ===
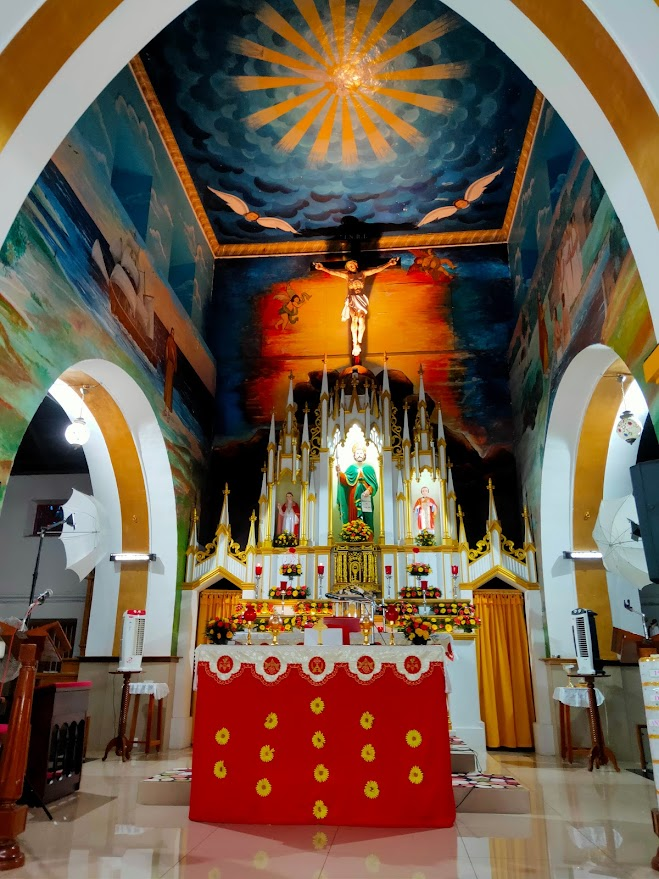
Madbaha of the Palayur Church

According to Saint Thomas Christian tradition, Saint Thomas traveled from Muziris (Kodungallur) and landed at Palayur by boat through the backwaters. At that time, Palayur was a stronghold of the Jainism, Buddhism and also of Jews. He came to visit the Jewish merchants at Palayur at Judankunnu (meaning the hill of Jews) and to preach the Christian gospel. The place has since become a dry land but its historicity as a boat jetty called locally 'Bottukulam' has been preserved as a monument to St. Thomas (see picture).

Of the seven churches traditionally said to have been established by Saint Thomas, only three–Palayur in the Syro-Malabar Catholic Archeparchy of Thrissur, Kottakkavu in the Syro-Malabar Catholic Major Archeparchy of Ernakulam-Angamaly, and Niranam in the Malankara Orthodox Diocese of Niranam–claim continuity, while the remaining four churches have undergone several changes in their locations.

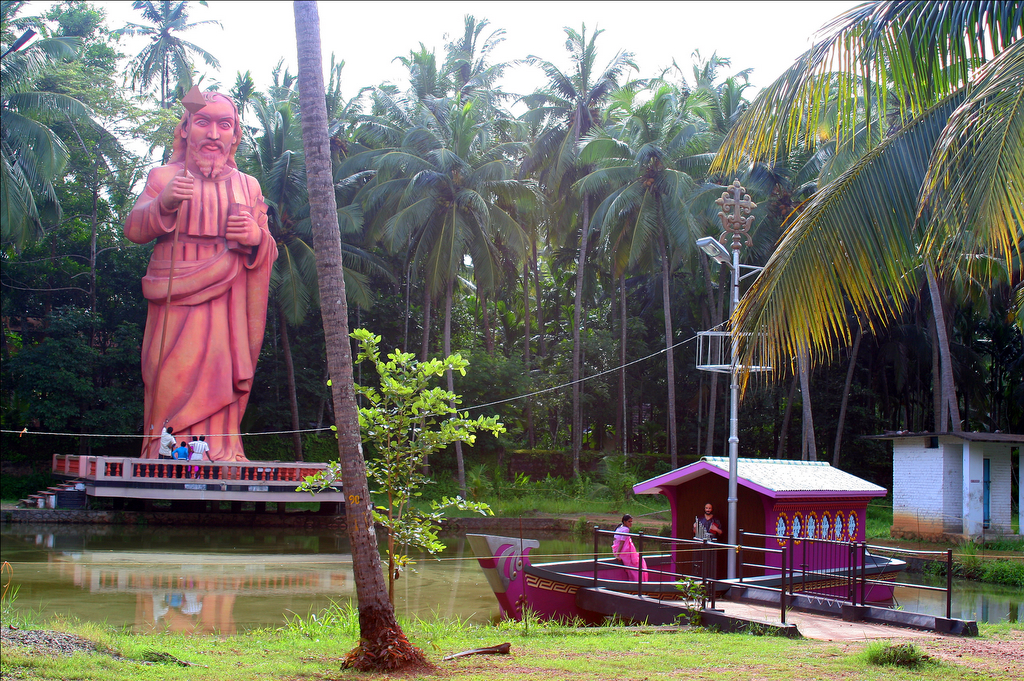
Palayur St.Thomas Monument

Historical legend records that when Saint Thomas landed at Palayur, he witnessed the sight of religious practice. They were offering prayers by chanting mantras, hymns to god in the form of Argyam or Tharpanam (water held in the palms) to the Sun god, a practice also said to be followed in Harappan and Persian cultures. Amused by the sight of water being thrown up by the Brahmins, from the palms of their hands, which was falling back, he challenged the Brahmins stating that the water they were offering was not being accepted by the Sun god as it was falling back into the tank. He made a deal with them stating that his God would accept the offer of water if he threw it up in the same way as they did: the water would not fall back. If he proved this then his God was superior and the Brahmins would have to embrace Christianity. He performed this miracle (summoned the Holy Trinity, completed the sign of the Cross and threw water held in his palms up into the air, which remained still in the air at a height) and with this miracle he converted a number of Brahmins and Jews in Palayur to Christianity. Thereafter he baptised the converts in a nearby water tank, now known as "Thaliyakulam" which is referred to as The First Baptism Pond, "The Birthplace of Christianity in India".

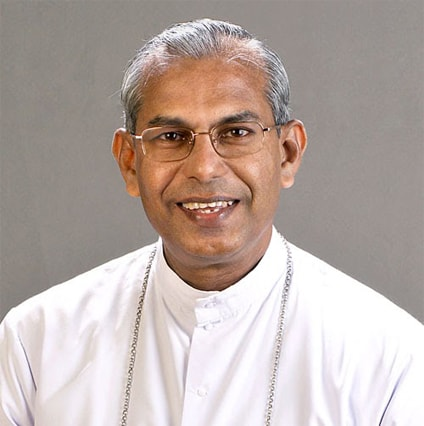
Metropolitan Archbishop of Thrissur and Custodian of Palayur Shrine

=== Historical accounts on Palayur Church ===
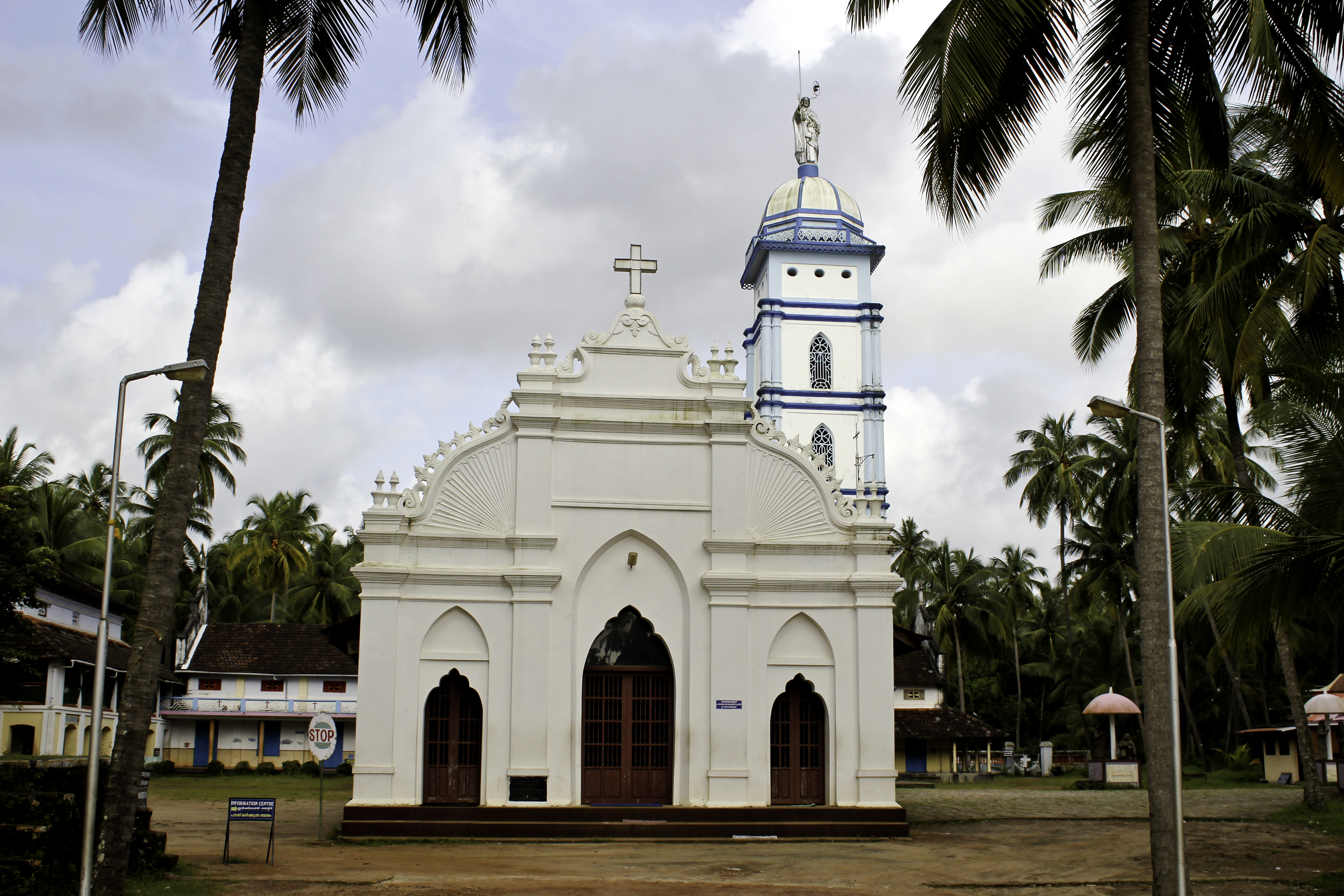
St. Thomas Syro-Malabar Church, Palayoor

- Account of East Syriac bishops

In 1504, Mar Yaballaha, Mar Denha, Mar Yaqob Abuna and Mar Thoma, the four East Syriac bishops consecrated for India by the Catholicos-Patriarch Mar Eliyah V, mentions the Christian community of Palur in a letter addressed to the Catholicos-Patriarch.

The countries of India are very numerous and powerful and their distance is about six months journey. Each country has a special name by which it is known, and our country in which the Christians are found is called Malabar. It has about twenty towns, out of which three are renowned and powerful Karangol [Kodungallūr], Pallur, and Kullam [Kollam], with others that are near them.

— MacKenzie 1901, p. 11

- Archdeacon Giwargis of Christ as Bishop of Palur

Archdeacon Giwargis of Christ was selected as the suffragan and coadjutor of Mar Abraham in the diocesan synod of Angamaly. Following this, the Chaldean Catholic Patriarch Mar Abdisho IV Maron, by a patriarchal decree dated 25 August 1566, appointed Giwargis of Christ as the Bishop of Palur and suffragan to Archbishop Mar Abraham of the Indian ecclesiastical province.

In 1578 Mar Abraham wrote a letter to Pope Gregory XIII, requesting papal confirmation

the appointment of his archdeacon as the bishop of Palur and as his successor. The letter is dated 2 January 1578. By the letter dated 3 January 1579, Pope Gregory XIII confirmed Giwargis of Christ as the administrator of the Archdiocese of Angamaly, in case of vacancy through the death of the Metropolitan Mar Abraham. On 4 March 1580, the pope confirmed his appointment as the Bishop of Palur and coadjutor of the Archbishop of Angamaly, Mar Abraham.

On 5 March 1580, the pope wrote a letter to the entire clergy and people of the Archdiocese of Angamaly, urging them to obey Metropolitan Mar Abraham and Giwargis of Christ, the bishop of Palur.

We, then being solicitous for your salvation and the tranquillity of your Church, exhort and advise you and by virtue of the power committed to us by Christ, also order you not to suffer yourselves to be infected by that pest [the reference is to the activities of Metropolitan Shemon], but evade it by all means: flee from his words and sermons; fear him as the enemy and eradicator of the Catholic faith, your salvation and the glory of Christ: eject him out of your community and gathering, permit him not to dwell among you nor to remain in your places. The same you should do with the rest of the heretics and schismatics lest corrupted by their pestiferous doctrine and contagion you should perish. Be you therefore obedient to your lord Archbishop Abraham and also to George, bishop of Palur, and live steadfast in the sincerity of Faith, in the simplicity of morals and in the unity of the holy mother the Church. Thus you attain to that eternal felicity and glory, which God has prepared and reserved for those who would live piously and holy...

— Giamil 1902, p. 608

- Renovation under Giacomo Fenicio

Rerum Indicarum (volume III) by Pierre du Jarric gives part of a letter by James Fenicio, a Jesuit missionary in the Zamorin's territory. This letter is the earliest European account of the Palur Church; as quoted above it has no date, but evidently belongs to the period between 1600 and 1607. The missionary had obtained permission to erect four churches in the Zamorin's territory:

I devoted all the remaining available time to the erection of these churches, and to the Christian inhabitants of this village [Palur]. I used to give them instructions as I chanced to meet them. As the church of Palur dedicated to Saint Cyriac [Quriaqus], which was the oldest (primus) among all the churches in Malabar, and renowned for favours and graces obtained, and for this reason much frequented, I devoted myself more especially to it. The stone church which I began two years ago [enclosing, apparently, within it the primitive building] had risen to the height of the windows. At this stage no one would dare to pull down the old wooden building, fearing to be struck down by sudden death: it stood surrounded by the walls of the new erection, but after I had prayed and removed their timidity, the old structure was pulled down, and the new building stood out in such fine proportions that the Hindus, the Mahomedans, and the Jews flocked to see it.

— Jarric 1615, pp. 50–51

From the Jesuit annual letter of 1607, Domenico Ferroli quotes a note from Fenicio:

"I cannot"-so he writes "easily describe the difficulties I encountered in going to Palur... When I arrived at Palur, the Zamorin invited me to dinner. I put on, on purpose. a sad and serious countenance, and said I had taken food already... I determined to preach in four parishes, as the Bishop of Angamale had begged of me, but I stopped longer at this Church of St. Quiricus, which is very old and famous for miracles... Two Kinglets, having in vain appealed to their idols, made vows in this Church with the object of getting an heir. God heard them. One determined to feed 500 or 1,000 of the faithful. The second called about 4,000. The first then, not wanting to be beaten in generosity, is preparing a larger invitation. Knowing that great crowds would be coming. I adorned the Church and arranged a grand procession, which was much admired and praised"...

— Ferroli 1939, pp. 409–410

This is one of the Seven churches traditionally assigned to the time when Saint Thomas preached in Malabar. The wooden structure must undoubtedly have been very old, and constructed no doubt of teak which grew all over the country even in comparatively recent times: at that early age the supply must have been very plentiful.

- Dom Alexis de Menezes and the Synod of Diamper

Antonio de Gouvea, a Portuguese missionary and chronicler of Dom Alexis de Menezes, records in his book "Jornada Dom Alexis de Menezes" about the church of Palur and other churches present nearby in the Kingdom of Zamorin:

On his way he was given letters from the Cassanars and Vicars whom from the Synod he had sent to the church of Pallur (Palayur), dedicated to the glorious Saint Cyriac Martyr, the last of this Christian community on the Northern side, in the lands of the king Samorin five leagues from Panane (Ponnani), a place well-known to the Portuguese and to our fleets, which meant to them a big disturbance with which the devil had deceived all those people, and the people of Anamaque (Enammavu) and Mutem (Mattam) and Chatacolangaree (Chattukulangara or Arthat Kunnamkulam), all in the lands of the king Samorin, and close to each other...

— Malekandathil 2003, pp. 442–443

He explains how Menezes corresponded with them through letters to gain their support for his Synod of Diamper and latinisation programme. Gouvea also specifies that Palur church had a vicar and it was dedicated to St. Cyriac. He also states that Palur is the last of the Saint Thomas Christian communities in the North, in the kingdom of Zamorin. He further reports an incident in the Palur church when three of their leading men enacted a drama by playing the roles of Saint Thomas and Saint Peter, the Apostles, and Saint Cyriac, the patron saint of the church. Throughout the play, Saint Thomas and Saint Peter argue with each other as to whose law is superior and applies to all of them. The drama concluded with a message from Saint Cyriac, ruling that both the laws of Saint Peter and Saint Thomas are equal and thus the Saint Thomas Christians had no obligation whatsoever to Saint Peter, nor to his apostolic see in Rome, but to the apostolic see of Babylon, which was of Saint Thomas. Gouvea interprets this event as one induced by Devil and comments that their actions are 'iron-bound under the 'law of Saint Thomas'.

In 1602, Francis Roz, the Bishop of Cranganore and the first Latin prelate of Saint Thomas Christians, made a pastoral visit to the church of Palur.

In 1632, Saint Thomas Christians under the leadership of Archdeacon Givargis of the Cross met at Edapally Church on 25 December 1632 and drew a resolution against the Latin Jesuit Archbishop Stephen Britto. This document introduces them as Malankara Mar Thoma Nasranikal (Saint Thomas Christians of Malabar), and their geographical distribution is set between Kollam in south and Palur in north.

Joseph Maria Sebastiani, the Vicar Apostolic of Malabar appointed by the Pope, on his first journey to Malabar in 1657, visits Palur church and meets the Vicar. He calls Palur, "primo luogo della Christianita della Serra" the primary place of Christianity in Malabar.

=== Palur Copper plates ===
Palur Copper Plates also known as Palayur Chempu Pattayam or Palayur Cheppēd is a set of four copper plates that were discovered from the Palayur Church. These have inscriptions in old Malayalam and Tamil Vattezhuthu script, and gives accounts of several the monetary and land deals of the church. The four plates are dated from 1606 (Kumbham 781 Malayalam Era), 1677 (Chingam 852 M. E.), 1681 (Mithunam 856 M. E.) and 1743 (Meenam, 918 M. E.) respectively. These plates were discovered in the 1920s by Henri Hosten, a Belgian Jesuit priest. The 4th plate, dated 1743, was the first to be deciphered and was published in the Travancore Archaeological Series in 1921. Following this, the second plate (dated 1677) and the third plate (dated 1681) were also published in the Travancore Archaeological Series in 1927 by A. S. Ramanatha Ayyar.

The plates provide details such as the names of the vicars of Palayur, namely Itty in 1606 and Chakko in 1677 and 1681. According to the first plate, the place name is Palur (in 1606) and in the second and third plates the place name evolves to Palaiyur (in 1677 and 1681) and finally in the fourth to Palayur (in 1743). The name of the patron saint of the church is mentioned as Maquriaka (in 1677) and Maquri (in 1681), both being Malayalam renderings of the Syriac name Mar Quriakose. These four plates are preserved at the Palayur Church Museum.

== Structure and Archpriests/Forane Vicars ==
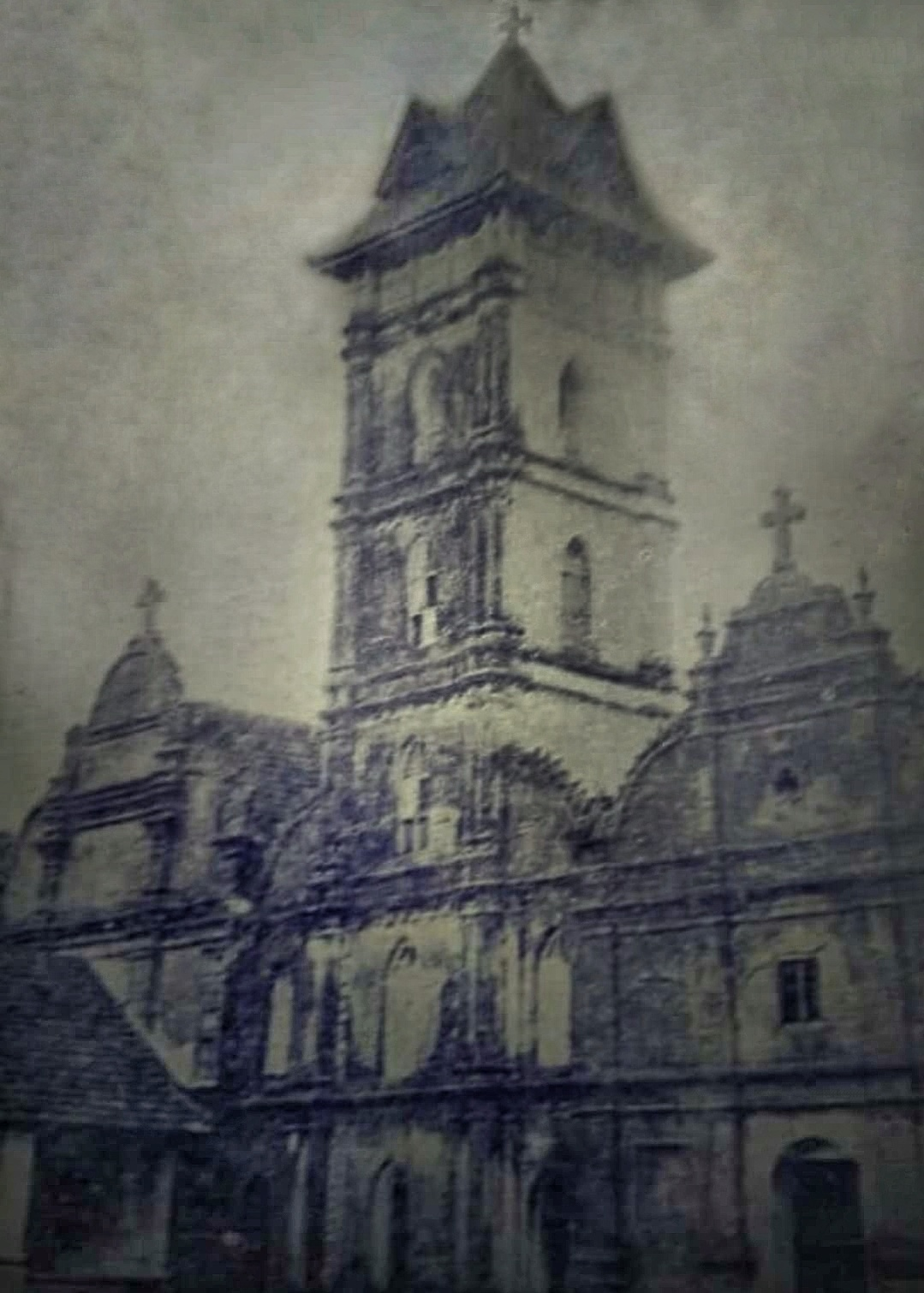
Old photograph

Following the migration of the Hindu Brahmins from Palayur, the Church was built incorporating the old Hindu temple, which was deserted. The church, as built, was thus a fusion of Hindu architectural style in respect of ornamentation with a Persian church plan. The roof of the church rises like a tower above the nave. The approach or entrance is like a Hindu style mandapa–in Indian architecture a pillared outdoor hall or pavilion for public rituals.

Giacomo Fenicio, an Italian missionary, built the new church around the small old teak wood church, after getting due permission from the locals who were not only superstitious but also sentimental about retaining the old Church. However, after the church was fully completed and after the priest had delivered a proper sermon, the local people agreed to demolish the old wooden structure, which resulted in the Church looking elegant. The original altar thought consecrated by Thomas is still retained. But during Tipu Sultan's invasion of Kerala in the 18th century, the church was destroyed by fire. Thereafter it was re-built.

Former Archpriests and Forane Vicars

- Fr. Davis Kannampuzha (2022–Present) Archpriest, Forane Vicar
- Fr. Vargheese Kariperi (2019 - 2022) Archpriest, Forane Vicar
- Fr. Jos Punnoliparambil (2016 - 2019) Forane Vicar
- Fr. John Ayyankanayil (2013 - 2016) Forane Vicar
- Fr. Bernard Thattil (2010 - 2013) Forane Vicar
- Fr. Louis Edakkalathur (2007 - 2010) Forane Vicar
- Fr. Chiramel George ( 2004 - 2007) Forane Vicar
- Fr. John Kidangan ( 2001 - 2004) Forane Vicar

== Festival ==
An annual two-day festival called the "Tharpana Thirunnal" held at the church bears a striking similarity to the Hindu festival held at Trichhur, a district town 28 kilometres (17 mi) away from the church on the same days, with lot of fanfare of pageants, orchestrations, and pyrotechnics. The annual Fireworks show held at this festival is famous around the state. During the Lenten season, the popular festival celebrated is called the 'Palayur Mahatheerthadanam' or Great Pilgrimage, conducted under the auspices of the archdiocese, when thousands of devotees, without caste distinction, participate in the festival.

== Bibliography ==
Notes

References

- Cheriyan, C. V. (1973). A History of Christianity in Kerala, from the Mission of St. Thomas to the arrival of Vasco Da Gama (A.D. 52-1498) (1973 ed.). Kerala Historical Society. - Total pages: 163
- Church History Association of India (1969). Indian Church History Review, Volume 3 (1969 ed.). Church History Association of India.
- Menon, A. Sreedhara (1962). Kerala District Gazetteers: Trichur, Kerala, Volume 7. Superintendent of Govt. Presses.
- George, V. C. (1972). Apostolate and Martyrdom of St. Thomas (1972 ed.). Kottayam Dt., Fr. Joseph Vadakkekara. - Total pages: 193
- Kurikilamkatt, James (2005). First voyage of the Apostle Thomas to India: ancient Christianity in Bharuch ... (2005 ed.). Asian Trading Corp. ISBN 81-7086-359-7. - Total pages: 264
- Varghese, Theresa (2006). Stark World Kerala (2006 ed.). Stark World Pub. ISBN 81-902505-1-5. - Total pages: 816
- Whitehouse, Thomas (1873). Lingerings of light in a dark land: researches into the Syrian church of Malabar (1873 ed.). William Brown & CO.
