= Abraham of Angamaly =

16th-century metropolitan of India

Mar Abraham Metropolitan and Gate of All India
- Rabba d Kolhon Apeskope u Metropolite (Superior of all the Bishops and Metropolitans)
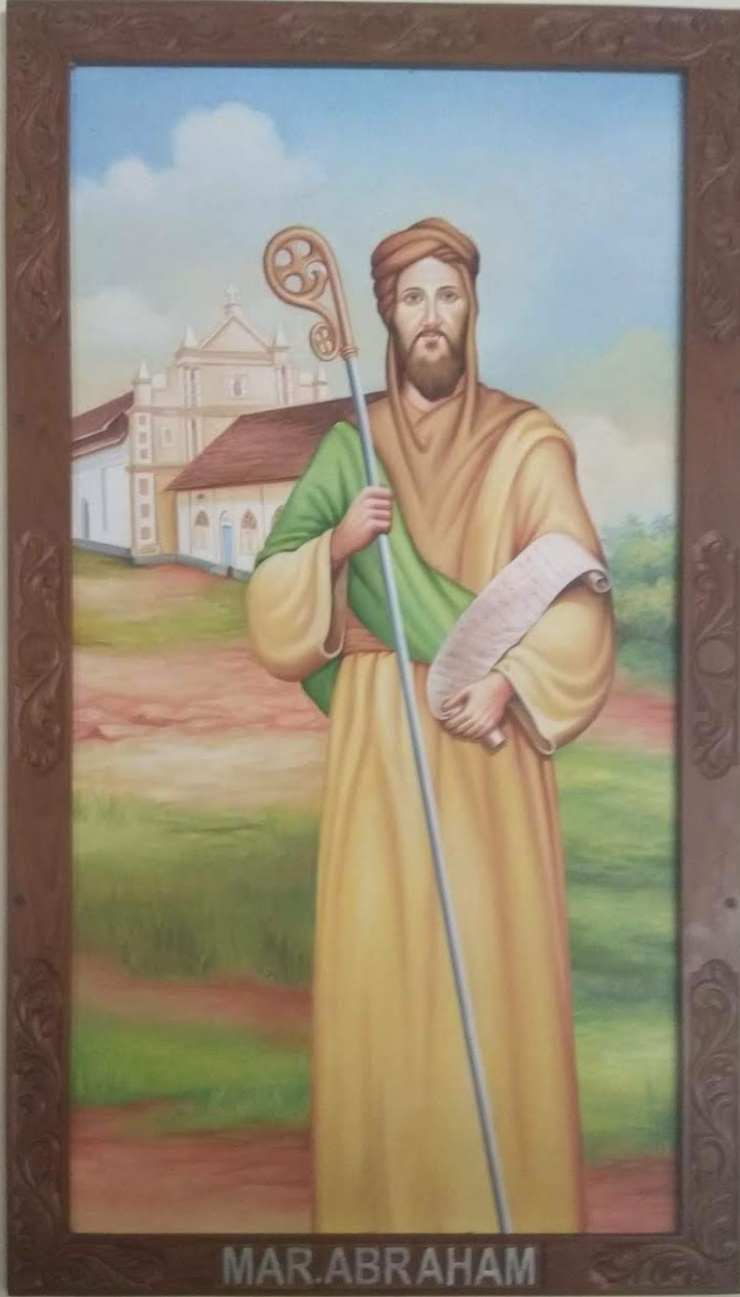
- Church: Church of the East (till 1565), Chaldean Catholic Church (since 1565)
- Diocese: India
- See: Angamaly
- Installed: 31 January 1565
- Term ended: 1597
- Predecessor: Jacob Abuna (Church of the East); Mar Joseph Sulaqa (Chaldean Catholic)
- Successor: Shemon (Church of the East); Francisco Ros (as bishop of Angamaly of the Latin Church)
- Opposed to: Portuguese Padroado and Metropolitan Shemon of the Church of the East

Orders
- Consecration: by Shemon VII Barmama (in Church of the East), Abdisho IV Maron, Giovanni Trevisan (in 1565)

Personal details
- Died: 1597 Angamaly
- Buried: Mar Hormiz Syro-Malabar Catholic Church, Angamaly

Mar Abraham (Syriac: ܐܒܪܗܡ ܡܛܪܢ, died 1597), also known as Abraham of Angamaly or Abraham of Gazira, was the last East Syrian bishop of the See of Angamaly, who entered into communion with Rome in 1565 and who was the last link in Angamaly from the long line of the bishops from the East Syriac bishops sent from the Church of the East to the Saint Thomas Christians. He first came to India in 1556 from the traditionalist (often referred as "Nestorian") patriarchate. Deposed from his position in 1558, he was taken to Lisbon by the Portuguese, escaped at Mozambique and left for his mother church in Mesopotamia, entered into communion with the Chaldean patriarchate. Subsequently, Abraham was appointed as Archbishop of Angamaly.

== Mar Abraham and Mar Joseph reaching Malabar ==
In 1552, a schism occurred within the Church of the East and a faction (modern-day Chaldean Catholic Church) led by Yohannan Sulaqa came in communion with the Holy See of Rome. Thus, parallel to the "traditionalist" (often referred as Nestorian) Patriarchate of the East, a "Chaldean" Patriarchate in communion with Rome came into existence. Following the schism, both factions began sending their own bishops to Saint Thomas Christians in Malabar in India. Apparently the first bishop who came to Malabar was Mar Abraham sent by the traditionalist Nestorian patriarch. It is not known exactly when Abraham reached Malabar, but he must have been there already in 1556. Approximately at the same time, the Chaldean Patriarch Abdisho IV also sent out a bishop Joseph Sulaqa, the brother of the first Chaldean patriarch Yohannan Sulaqa, to Malabar.

Mar Joseph was sent to India with letters of introduction from the Pope to the Portuguese authorities; he was besides accompanied by Bishop Ambrose, a Dominican and papal commissary to the first patriarch, by his socius Father Anthony, and by Mar Elias Hormaz, Archbishop of Diarbekir. They arrived at Goa in November 1556, and were detained at Goa for eighteen months before being allowed to enter the diocese. when the Portuguese were finally alerted by the presence of Mar Abraham and allowed Mar Joseph to occupy his see. Proceeding to Cochin they lost Bishop Ambrose; the others travelled through Malabar for two and a half years on foot, visiting every church and detached settlement. Mar Elias returned to his own archbishopric of Diarbekir in Mesopotamia. In this way, nominally there were two rival East Syrian bishops in Malabar until 1558,

== Mar Abraham joining in Chaldean Patriarchate ==
Faced with a schism, Mar Joseph turned to the Portuguese for help. The Portuguese arrested Mar Abraham and shipped him to Europe. But on the way he succeeded in escaping at Mozambique, found his way back to Mesopotamia, and went straight to Mar Abdisho IV the Chaldean Patriarch, having realized from the Indian experience that unless he secured a nomination from him it would be difficult to establish himself in Malabar. Patriarch Abdisho IV, who re-consecrated Mar Abraham as bishop of Chaldean Catholic Church and sent him to Rome. In Rome Pope Pius IV welcomed Mar Abraham and on 23 February 1565 wrote a letter to Mar Abdisho IV asking him to appoint Mar Abraham as Archbishop of Angamaly. The Pope wanted Mar Abraham to reign jointly with Mar Joseph and he requested patriarch Abdisho to divide the diocese between Mar Joseph and Mar Abraham. Both the Patriarch and the Pope, having joined together in sending Mar Abraham to India, gave him authority to divide the sphere of Thomas Christians between himself and Mar Joseph. (But this arrangement was never carried into effect, since Mar Joseph having already again been arrested and exiled for a third time, died in Rome in 1569.) All the holy orders which Mar Abraham had received had been conferred in the independent Eastern church, and were therefore from the strict Roman point of view invalid or doubt. In order to set all doubts at rest, Pope Pius IV arranged for all the orders up to and including the episcopate to be quietly conferred on Mar Abraham. John Baptist bishop of Holy Savior had ordered Mar Abraham at Venice, from tonsure to priesthood. Mar Abraham was then again consecrated bishop in the Chapel of San Giusto of the Patriarchal Palace of Castello on 17 June 1565 by the Patriarch of Venice Giovanni Trevisan.

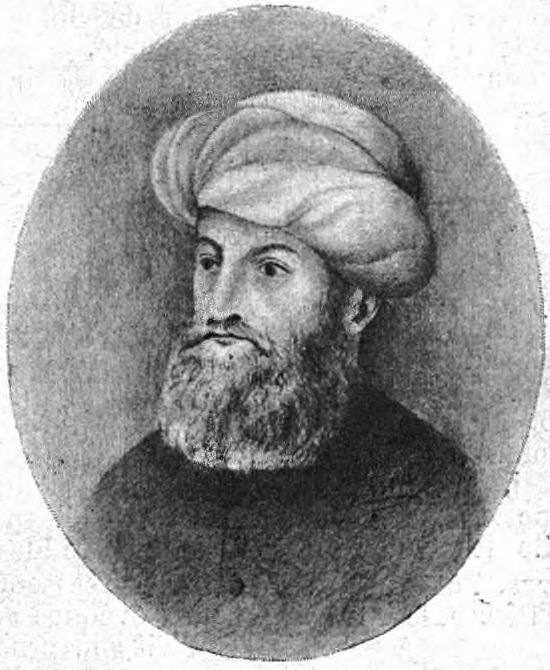
Patriarch Abdisho IV Maron

== Metropolitan of Angamaly (1568-1597) ==
Mar Abraham reached Goa in 1568. In spite of the express approbation by Pope Pius IV (1565), he was not welcomed by the Portuguese viceroy in India and was arrested a second time. Mar Abraham was detained in a convent, but escaped and entered Malabar. His arrival was a surprise and a joy to the people. He kept out of the reach of the Portuguese, living among the churches in the hilly parts of the country. In time he was left in peaceful occupation. As is usual in such cases the old tendencies assumed once more their ascendency, and he returned to his teaching and practices, Complaints were made by Jesuits; Rome sent warnings to Abraham to allow Catholic doctrine to be preached and taught to his people. At one time he took the warning seriously to his heart. In 1583, Alessandro Valignano, Visitor of the Jesuit missions, devised a means of forcing a reform. He persuaded Mar Abraham to assemble a synod, convening the clergy and the chiefs of the laity. He also prepared a profession of faith which was to be made publicly by the bishop and all present. Moreover, urgent reforms were sanctioned and agreed to. A letter was sent by Pope Gregory XIII on 28 November 1578, laying down what Abraham had to do for the improvement of his diocese; after the synod, Abraham sent a long letter to the pope in reply, specifying all that he had been able to do by the aid of the Fathers. This is called the first attempts to latinize the Syrians of the Church. It was formal and public, but the liturgical books were not changed nor attempts to latinize the Syrian Church was much successful.

== Rabban Hormizd Church, built by Mar Abraham ==
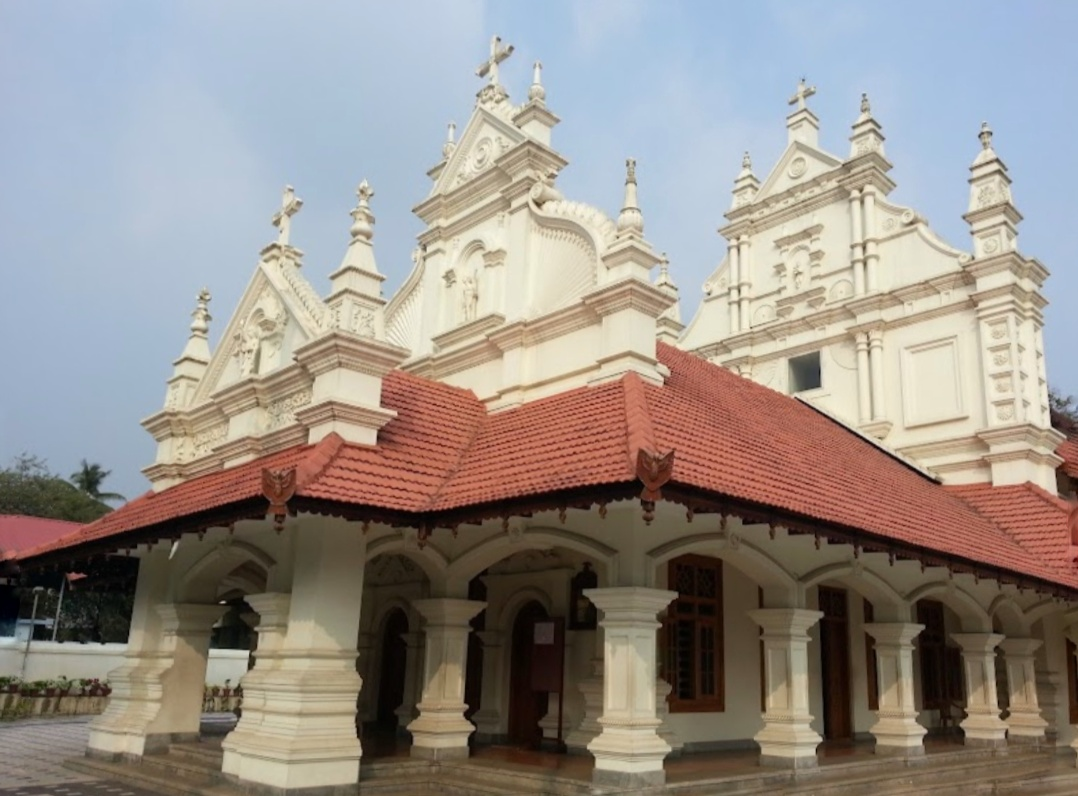
Mar Hormizd Syro-Malabar Church (Old Cathedral), Cathedral of Mar Abraham.

In 1570, Mar Abraham established his cathedral church dedicated to Rabban Hormizd, a seventh century Abbot of the East Syriac Church, as its patron. In 1578, as a response to the requests made by Jesuit missionaries who had been working in Angamaly and in the other centres of the Saint Thomas Christians, the pope granted plenary indulgences to the Church of Rabban Hormizd, which the faithful could obtain four times a year for 25 years from the year of the election of Metropolitan Mar Abraham. The indulgences covered two feasts of the Patron Rabban Hormizd that fell on the fifteenth day after Easter (Monday) and on the first of September. On 15 August 1579, as requested by Mar Abraham, the Jesuits laid the foundation stone of a new cathedral namely "Rabban Hormizd" in the same place chosen by the Metropolitan. The Synod of Diamper of the year 1599, prohibited the Christians from commemorating the feast of Rabban Hormizd, since Rabban Hormizd was considered a Nestorian heretic by the Latin missionaries. Session 3, Canon 14 of the Synod severely condemned Rabban Hormizd. According to the new regulations, the Synod commanded as planned by Archbishop Menezes that the Christians celebrate the feast of Saint Hormizd, the Martyr (according to the Roman Martyrology published from Rome in 1583), a Persian Catholic saint who lived in the fifth century, suppressing the memory of Rabban Hormizd. The Feast was fixed on 8 August according to the Canon 10 of the Session 2 of the Synod of Diamper.

The efforts of Archbishop Menezes and the Portuguese missionaries to replace Rabban Hormizd as patron of St. Hormizd church with St. Hormizd the martyr is an instance of sixteenth-century attempts at forced Latinization. It is doubtful whether the Christians immediately accepted this change of patronage. Bishop Francis Ros, the first Latin bishop of the Saint Thomas Christians, attempted to resolve the conflicts created by the coercive Synod of Diamper and convoked the Second Synod of Angamaly in December 1603.

== Later years and death ==
In 1595, Mar Abraham fell dangerously ill but recovered. In 1597 he again became dangerously ill. He would not even avail himself of the exhortations of the Fathers who surrounded his bed, nor did he receive the last sacraments. Thus he died in January 1597. The viceroy made known his death to Archbishop Menezes, then absent on a visitation tour, by letter of 6 Feb. 1597. The Archdeacon during the first part of the reign of Mar Abraham was George of Christ, who was on friendly terms with the Latin missionaries and was to be appointed the successor of Mar Abraham as Metropolitan of India. Thus, he should have become, according to the plans of Mar Abraham, supported by the Jesuits, the first indigenous Chaldaean Metropolitan of the St Thomas Christians. However, the last letter of Mar Abraham, in which he requests the Pope to confirm George's ordination as Bishop of Palur and his successor, is dated 13 January 1584, while from another letter of the same Mar Abraham we learn that the consecration of George failed because of the latter's death.

== The tomb of Mar Abraham ==
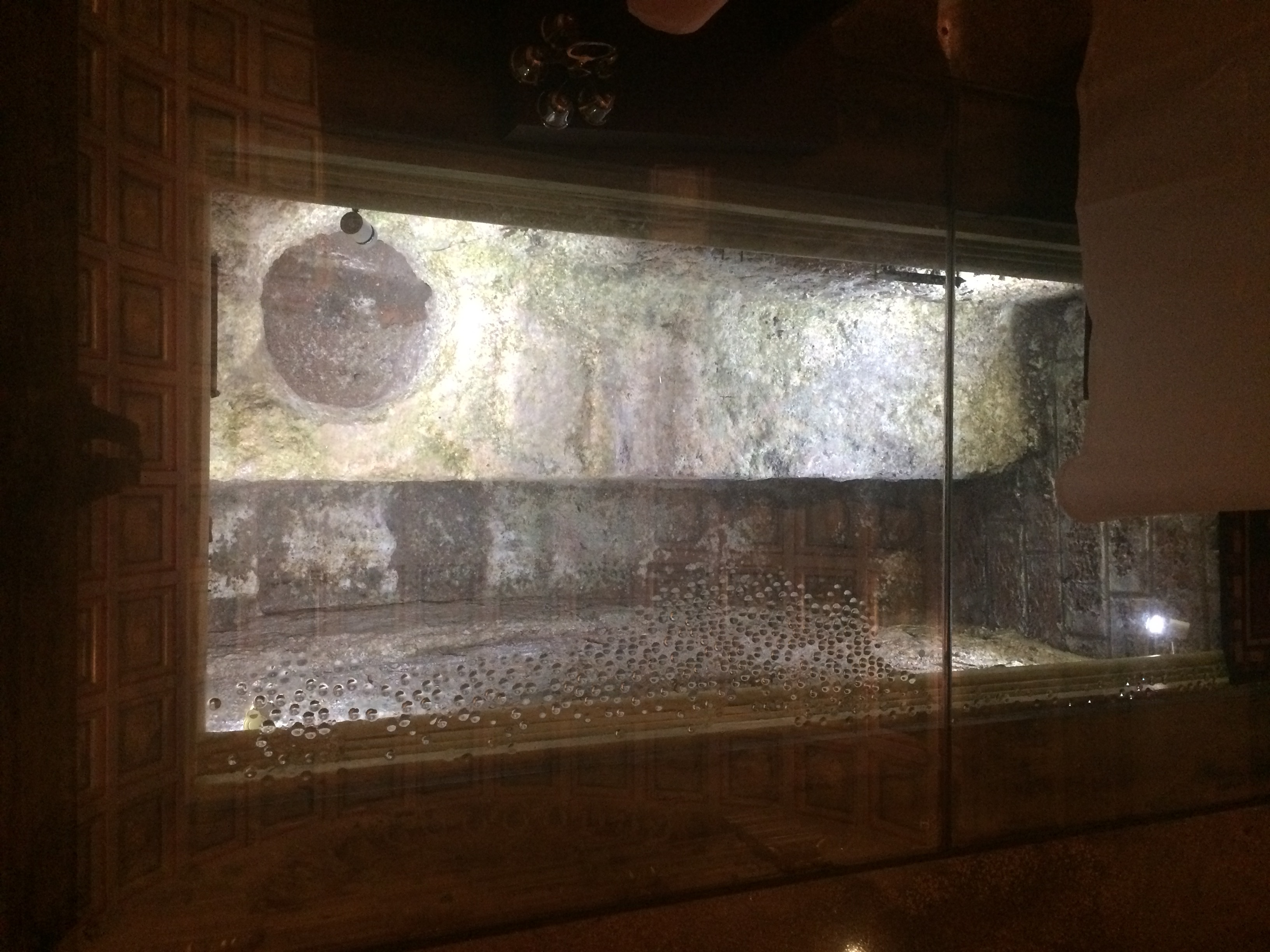
Tomb of last East Syriac Metropolitan Mar Abraham inside the Qanke of Mar Hormizd Syro-Malabar Church, Angamaly

The tomb of Mar Abraham was discovered in September 2015, in the sanctuary of St. Hormizd Church in Angamaly on the occasion of the renovation of the church. This church has witnessed many of the revolutions of the Christians of St. Thomas in the past against the new Latin hierarchy imposed upon them after the Synod of Diamper. The Christians used to assemble around the tomb in order to discuss important matters and to adopt resolutions concerning their future proceedings. One of the resolutions at the tomb of Mar Abraham was made by all the Christians, immediately after his death in 1597. The second resolution was made in 1601, by about 200 Christians who withdrew their obedience to Francisco Ros, S.J, the first Latin bishop of Angamaly.

== See also ==
- Synod of Diamper
- Christianity in India
- Church of the East
- Syrian Malabar Nasrani
- Hormizd, the Martyr
- Rabban Hormizd
