= John Baptist Abyssinian =

Abyssinian Catholic bishop (1509–1567)

- Bishop of Holy Savior of Nicosia
- Church: Catholic Church
- Appointed: 7 February 1565
- Term ended: 1567

Personal details
- Born: about 1509 Cyprus, Venetian Republic
- Died: 1567 (aged 57–58) Cyprus, Venetian Republic

John Baptist Abyssinian (or Yohannǝs; Latin: Johannes Baptista Abessinus or Habiscinus; Italian: Giovanni Battista Indiano; 1509–1567) was an Abyssinian of the Ethiopian community in Nicosia in Cyprus, who in 1565 was appointed Catholic bishop of the church of Holy Savior in Nicosia and papal nuncio to the Eastern Churches. He became the second black bishop and the first black nuncio in the modern history of the Catholic Church.

== Early life ==
The father of John Baptist was an Ethiopian deacon while his mother was Egyptian from Manfalut but of Abyssinian descent. During the persecution by Sultan Qansuh al-Ghawri they escaped to Nicosia, Cyprus, at the time governed by the Republic of Venice, and they joined the little local Ethiopian community. John Baptist was born there on about 1509. (Note: According to Harduin in 1562 John Baptist was already in his sixties, thus his year of birth could be 1502 or before.)

When fifteen years old, he started a long pilgrimage visiting Rome (where his father died), and he travelled the Way of St. James to Santiago de Compostela. Arrived in Lisbon, he participated to a mission in the Portuguese India to rescue a Portuguese embassy sent in 1520 to meet Emperor Lebna Dengel. In November 1526 he left to return to Lisboa where he arrived on 24 July 1527 along with Francisco Álvares. John Baptist remained in Lisbon for five years, and only in 1532 he followed Francisco Álvares and Martinho de Portugal in Bologna to meet Pope Clement VII. After the meeting, hold on 29 January 1533, they went to Rome, and finally, in 1535, John Baptist returned to Cyprus. The historicity of his travel in India or Ethiopia is questioned by Nosnitsin and Kelly.

== Priest ==
In 1538 he was ordained priest by Giovanni, the Coptic bishop of Cyprus, and he celebrated the liturgy in Ethiopian rite. Due to the poverty of his community, in 1538 John Baptist returned in Italy settling in Capodistria near Venice. After the authorization from the local bishop Pietro Paolo Vergerio, he started to celebrate the Mass in Roman Rite, being hired as preacher. Already in 1540 Cardinal Gasparo Contarini asked him to come to Rome, probably due to his knowledge of Eastern Christianity.

In 1542, at the end of the two years of employment as preacher, John Baptist finally arrived to Rome. However Cardinal Contarini had moved to Bologna, where he died shortly after, and John Baptist was accepted as a chaplain in the house of Cardinal Gian Pietro Carafa, later Pope Paul IV, a fierce opponent of any ecumenical issue. Cardinal Carafa was uncertain about the validity of the sacraments that John had received by a Coptic bishop, and spoke of that with Pope Julius III, who ordered the Inquisition to investigate: the result was that John had to receive again Confirmation and Holy Orders in Roman Rite.

In Rome he translated the Ethiopian Liturgy into Latin in 1547 (now lost). He is also known as copyist of manuscripts in Geez. At the end of 1550's he became the abbot of the monastery of Santo Stefano degli Abissini in the Vatican. Because of his knowledge of languages, especially Arabic, he served as an interpreter for the Pope and cardinals. In 1562 he translated the creed of the Chaldean Patriarch Abdisho IV Maron into Latin.

== Bishop ==
In 1564 John Baptist was selected to be became bishop of Ethiopian community in Cyprus, and possibly as papal envoy to the Eastern Churches. The High Inquisitor, Cardinal Alessandrino, later Pope Pius V, proceeded with a deep investigation on John's life and morality, whose acts are the main source of his biography. (Note: Vatican Apostolic Archive: AA Arm. I-XVIII n. 2953) In the papal consistory of 7 February 1565 was discussed among the cardinals whether to appoint him as a titular bishop or not, because the church of Holy Savior was in town of Nicosia which already had a Latin bishop and it was uncommon to have two bishops for the same locality: in the end the position of Cardinal Alessandrino was agreed, and in that consistory John Baptist was formally appointed bishop of the Ethiopian community gathered round the church of Holy Savior with the tile of Episcopus Ecclesiae Sancti Salvatoris Nicosiensis, however suffragan of the Latin Archbishop of Nicosia. (Note: Vatican Apostolic Archive, Arch. Concist.: Acta Camerarii 9 c.116v and Acta Misc. 34 c.256v-257r) His episcopal consecration probably followed immediately after, because on next 13 February in Rome he was already called bishop.

On 10 March 1565 Pope Pius IV appointed him as papal nuncio to the East to convey the decisions of the Council of Trent to the Eastern Church Patriarchs of the Armenians, Syrians, Chaldeans and Maronites. On 17 June 1565 he was in Venice assisting Patriarch Giovanni Trevisan in the consecration of Abraham of Angamaly, and then he left for Cyprus.

His death is reported in a letter from Cyprus dated 6 October 1567: he had no time to visit the other Eastern Churches as papal nuncio. On 1 July 1570 Nicosia was conquered by the Ottomans, and his little diocese vanished.
