= Second Synod of Angamaly =

Diocesan synod

The Second Synod of Angamaly was a Christian council held in Angamaly in Kerala, India in 1603.

It was convoked by Dom Francis Ros, S.J., the first Latin bishop of Angamaly, the See of Saint Thomas Christians on 7 December 1603. Ros was the successor of Mar Abraham of Angamaly, the Metropolitan of All-India.

The Second Synod of Angamaly had primarily three tasks to undertake. The context of the diocese of Angamaly, immediately after the Synod of Diamper, necessitated another Synod in Ros's fourth year of governance.

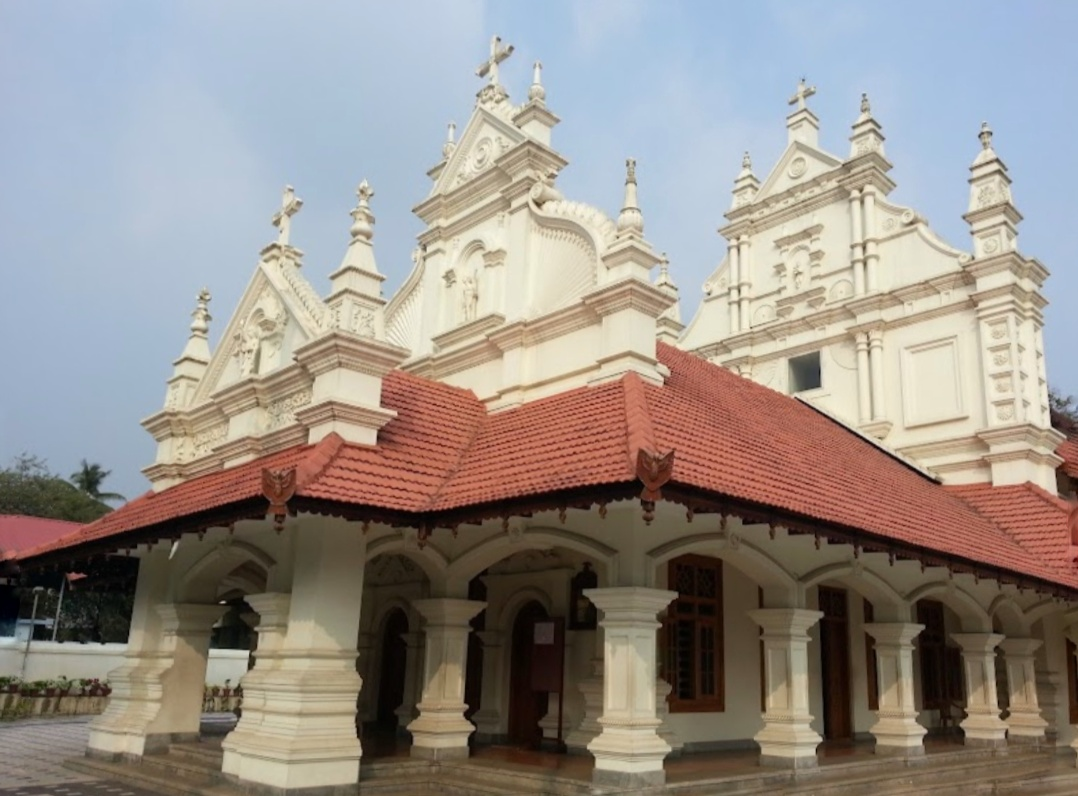
Mar Hormizd Cathedral Church, Angamaly

== Introduction ==
The First Synod of Angamaly was held in 1582 and was presided over by the Metropolitan, Mar Abraham. This synod looked at the liturgical books of the Syrians and the establishment of a seminary in Vypeecotta, as well as other matters. Angamaly was the first archdiocese in India at this time. It was later merged with the Goa Archdiocese.

When Dom Francis Ros returned to Angamaly on 1 May 1601, he was welcomed by the Archdeacon Givargis of the Cross (George of the Cross) and the Christians of St. Thomas. Soon after, the new bishop realised that there was resistance on the part of the Christians of St. Thomas, regarding the suppression of their ancient Metropolitan title. At the same time, a number of decrees of the Synod of Diamper (or Udayamperoor) in 1599; these were seen as an imposition on the Christians, designed by Archbishop Aleixo de Menezes in a context of tension and the resistance of the native priests.

In this context, Ros wanted to convoke a new Synod to substitute the Synod of Diamper, respecting the law of the Latin Church of the time. The synod resolved three issues which had followed the Synod of Diamper.

After the second synod, Angamaly became a separate Archdiocese again.
