= Estevão de Brito =

Portuguese Jesuit and Roman Catholic prelate

Most Reverend Estevão de Brito SJ
- Archbishop of Cranganore
- Church: Catholic Church
- Archdiocese: Archdiocese of Cranganore
- In office: 1624–1641
- Predecessor: Francis Ros
- Successor: Francisco Garcia Mendes
- Previous post: Titular Bishop of Salona

Orders
- Ordination: 1603
- Consecration: 29 September 1624 by Sebastião de São Pedro

Personal details
- Born: 1567 Estremoz, Portugal
- Died: 2 December 1641 (aged 73–74) Cranganore, India

Estevão de Brito, S.J. (1567–1641), in Latin Stephanus de Britto, was a Portuguese Jesuit and Roman Catholic prelate who served as Archbishop of Cranganore (1624–1641) and Titular Bishop of Salona (1621–1624).

== Biography ==
Estevão de Brito was born in Estremoz, Portugal in 1567 and professed a priest in the Society of Jesus in 1603. On 11 January 1621, he was appointed during the papacy of Pope Paul V as Titular Bishop of Salona and Coadjutor Archbishop of Cranganore. Om 18 February 1624, he succeeded to the bishopric. On 29 September 1624, he was consecrated bishop by Sebastião de São Pedro, Bishop of Cochin. He served as Archbishop of Cranganore until his death on 2 December 1641.

== External links and additional sources ==
- Cheney, David M. "Salona (Titular See)". Catholic-Hierarchy.org. (for Chronology of Bishops) ^{[self-published]}
- Chow, Gabriel. "Titular Episcopal See of Salona (Italy)". GCatholic.org. (for Chronology of Bishops) ^{[self-published]}

Catholic Church titles
Preceded by Caesar Fedele	Titular Bishop of Salona; 1621–1624	Succeeded by Giovanni Pietro Volpi
Preceded by Francis Ros	Archbishop of Cranganore; 1624–1641	Succeeded by Francisco Garcia Mendes
