= Joseph Sulaqa =

Mar Joseph Sulaqa
- Metropolitan and Gate of All India
- Church: Chaldean Catholic Church
- Diocese: India
- Installed: 1555
- Term ended: 1567
- Predecessor: Mar Yaqob (1503-1552)-The last pre-schism East Syriac Metropolitan of India.
- Successor: Mar Abraham-The last East Syriac (Chaldean) Metropolitan of India.

Orders
- Ordination: 1555 by Abdisho IV Maron (1555–1570)

Personal details
- Died: 1569 Rome
- Buried: Rome?

Mar Joseph Sulaqa (Syriac: ܝܘܣܦ ܣܘܠܩܐ), also known as Yousep d'Bēth Bello (Syriac: ܝܘܣܦ ܪܒܝܬ ܒܠܘ, lit. 'Joseph of the house of Bello'), was one of the last East Syriac bishops to Malabar. He was shortly followed by Mar Abraham; both reached in Malabar after the arrival of the Portuguese. Patriarch Abdisho IV Maron (1555–1570), the successor of Shimun VIII Yohannan Sulaqa, sent the brother of Shimun VIII, Mar Joseph, to Malabar as a Chaldaean bishop; although consecrated in 1555 or 1556, Mar Joseph could not reach India before the end of 1556, nor Malabar before 1558, when the Portuguese were finally alerted by the presence of Mar Abraham and allowed Mar Joseph, accompanied by another Chaldaean bishop, Mar Eliah, to occupy his see, before the Inquisition also sent him to Lisbon in 1562.

== Introduction ==
The last two Assyrian bishops of Malabar were Joseph Sulaqa and Mar Abraham; both arrived in Malabar after the arrival of the Portuguese.

There is no doubt that Joseph Sulaqa's appointment was canonical, for he, the brother of the first Chaldean patriarch Shimun VIII Yohannan Sulaqa, was appointed by his successor Abdisho IV Maron and sent out to Malabar. Before that he was the bishop of Nineveh (Joseph was consecrated Metropolitan by his own brother Patriarch John Sulaqa in 1554 AD)). Joseph was sent to India with letters of introduction from the pope to the Portuguese authorities; he was besides accompanied by Bishop Ambrose, a Dominican and papal commissary to the first patriarch, by his socius Father Anthony, and by Mar Elias Hormaz, Archbishop of Diarbekir.

They arrived at Goa about 1563, and were detained at Goa for eighteen months before being allowed to enter the diocese. Proceeding to Cochin they lost Bishop Ambrose; the others travelled through Malabar for two and a half years on foot, visiting every church and detached settlement. By the time they arrived at Angamale war broke out. Then Mar Elias, Anthony the socius of the deceased prelate, and one of the two Syrian monks who had accompanied them, left India to return; the other monk remained with Archbishop Joseph Sulaka. For some time the new prelate got on well with the Portuguese and Jesuit missionaries, in fact, they praised him for having introduced order, decorum, and propriety in the Church services and all went harmoniously for some time. Later, friction arose because of his hindering the locally-ordained Syrians from saying mass and preaching and instructing his flock. Eventually an incident revealed that Mar Joseph had not dropped his allegiance to the Church of the East, for it was reported to the Bishop of Cochin that he had attempted to tamper with the faith of some young boys in his service belonging to the Diocese of Cochin. This came to the knowledge of the bishop, through him to the Metropolitan of Goa, then to the viceroy; it was decided to remove and send him to Portugal, to be dealt with by the Holy See.

Accusing Mar Joseph for propagating "Nestorian error" they sent him to Portugal; arriving there he succeeded in securing the good will of the Queen, he expressed repentance, and by order of the queen was sent back to his diocese.

== Later years and death ==
By 1567, Latin authorities asked him to make inquiries into the conduct and doctrine of the prelate suspected again for propagating Nestorian error; in consequence of this the first provincial council was held and finally, Mar Joseph, who was forced to leave India in 1568 died in Rome in 1569, where his brother Sulaqa was consecrated as patriarch 16 years earlier. His tomb has not been located so far.

Eugene Tisserant in his book Eastern Christianity in India comments on the pathetic end of Mar Joseph Sulaqa. Cardinal comments.

Yet the measure of suffering was full, and Mar Joseph received, near the tomb of the Apostles, the crown which he had merited, through his long and slow martyrdom which was perhaps a more painful one than that of his heroic brother (Shimun VIII Yohannan Sulaqa).

— Cardinal Eugene Tesserant, Eastern Christianity in India, Translated by E. R. Hambye, Culcutta:Orient Longmans, 1957, p. 41.

== See also ==
- Synod of Diamper
- India (East Syrian Ecclesiastical Province)
- Christianity in India
- Church of the East
- Syrian Malabar Nasrani
