= Archdiocese of Angamaly =

Former Chaldean Catholic ecclesiastical jurisdiction in India

Metropolitan Archdiocese of Angamaly
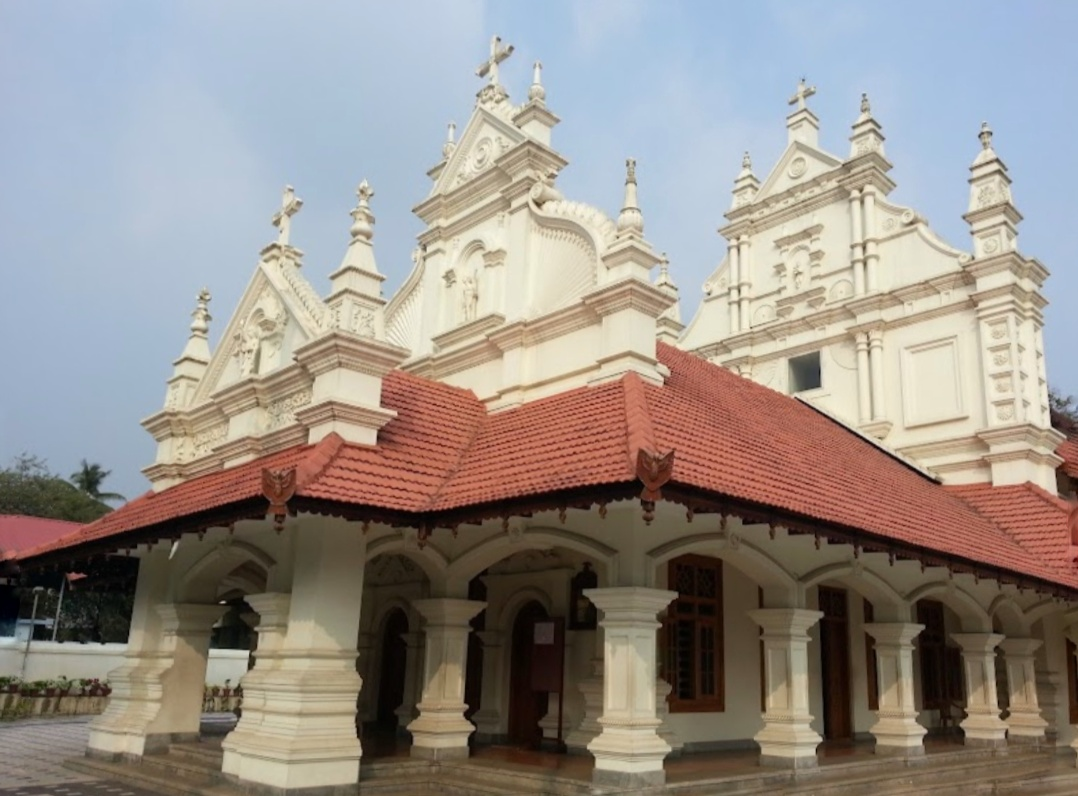
- Rabban Mar Hormizd Cathedral in Angamaly, built in 1577 by Archbishop Abraham, was the archiepiscopal seat of the Archdiocese of Angamaly.

Location
- Country: India
- Territory: India
- Headquarters: School of Angamaly, Angamaly, Kingdom of Mangattu, Malabar

Information
- Denomination: Saint Thomas Christians
- Sui iuris church: Chaldean Catholic Church
- Rite: East Syriac Rite
- Established: 1554
- Dissolved: 1599 (latinised by the Synod of Diamper)
- Cathedral: Rabban Mar Hormizd Cathedral

The Metropolitan Archdiocese of Angamaly was an ecclesiastical jurisdiction of the Chaldean Catholic Church in Malabar, India. It came into existence as a Catholic continuation of the Ecclesiastical Province of India of the Church of the East following the schism of 1552. Originally referred to as the Archdiocese of India, it was renamed Angamaly in 1565 and existed till 1599 when it was ultimately suppressed by the colonial Synod of Diamper and replaced by the Portuguese Padroado administered Diocese of Angamaly (later Archdiocese of Cranganore) suffragan to the Padroado Primatal Archdiocese of Goa. The brief and turbulent history of the archdiocese is noted for the two archbishops, namely Joseph Sulaqa and Abraham, who were the last Persian prelates to govern the undivided Saint Thomas Christian community in South India.

== Yawsep Sulaqa ==
Mar Yawsep was the first Chaldean Catholic metropolitan of India. Yawsep opposed Mar Abraham, who arrived in Malabar originally as an orthodox East Syriac metropolitan before 1556 much before his own arrival. Abraham had established himself in the Vatakkumkūr Kingdom where Portuguese influence was minimal. The Portuguese were completely reluctant to let Eastern bishops in Malabar and had detained Mar Yawsep and those who came with him, including the Papal legate Ambrose Buttigieg, for about 18 months in Goa. However in order to oppose Mar Abraham, they allowed Mar Yawsep to briefly occupy his see in Malabar. Giwargis of Christ was appointed archdeacon by Yawsep. Abraham was arrested by the Portuguese in 1558 and on the way to Portugal, he escaped from their captivity in Mozambique and went to meet Patriarch Abdisho IV in Gazarta. With the Chaldean patriarch's recommendation, he met the Pope Pius IV in Rome in 1565 and managed to obtain papal confirmation and goodwill.

By this time, the Portuguese had already arrested Yawsep and deported him to Lisbon in 1562, accusing him of being a 'Nestorian heretic'. He was sent back to Malabar with papal approval, only to be arrested for a third time by the Portuguese in 1567. Before being captured, Yawsep is said to have appointed two archdeacons, one each for the Northerners and for the Southerners, whom Perczel interprets as for the 'Northists' and 'Southists'. Meanwhile, the Pope had suggested the Chaldean patriarch to divide the Indian archdiocese between Yawsep and Abraham. But Yawsep could not return to Malabar and died in Rome in 1569, after having been arrested and exiled by the Portuguese in 1567.

== Abraham of Angamaly ==
Following his conversion to Catholicism, Abraham was appointed as the Archbishop of Angamaly by Patriarch Abdisho IV and sent to India with papal mandate. On arrival, Portuguese arrested him and detained him in Goa. For a second time, Abraham escaped the Portuguese captivity and escaped to Malabar and settled in the interior settlement of Angamaly. Choosing Angamaly as the metropolitan see was Abraham's strategic decision, as it offered him three benefits: political protection away from Portuguese-allied coastline kingdoms such as Cochin and Kollam, an appanage government system characterised by a hierarchical dynastic federation of the four Mangate Swaroopam rulers and very strong orthodox East Syriac Christian presence. Abraham had also recommended to the Chaldean patriarch that Giwargis, the archdeacon of Mar Yawsep, be appointed as his suffragan bishop. Abraham administered the church in Angamaly along with Giwargis, who was appointed accordingly as 'Bishop of Palur' by the patriarch. The patriarch also gave Abraham the permission to consecrate Giwargis as a bishop.

Around this time, an orthodox East Syriac bishop named Mar Simeon arrived in Malabar. Simeon managed to obtain the support of Archdeacon Yaqov who was based in the Vatakkumkūr Kingdom. This became a crisis for Abraham and to gain the support of the Portuguese, he was forced to outwardly implement their policies. Yielding to their insistence, Abraham convened a Synod in Angamaly as suggested by Alexandro Valignano in 1583.

In 1580, papal endorsement was given for Giwargis' episcopal consecration, in response to the request of the Jesuits. However the consecration did not happen as originally planned by Abraham. Francisco Dionysio, a contemporary missionary, says that Giwargis was not willing to accept it due to his humility.

In 1593, Abraham appointed Giwargis of Cross as his archdeacon. In 1594, Abraham submitted a petition to the Pope requesting that Giwargis be declared his co-adjutor and successor. During this period, Mar Abraham tried to improve his relations with the Jesuits and began to cooperate with them. In 1595, Abraham, who was seriously ill, made a testament declaring Giwargis of Cross as the administrator of the archdiocese in his absence. Abraham prepared to consecrate Geevarghese using the authority bestowed upon him by the Chaldean Patriarch, but the Jesuits prevented him from doing so, insisting that the Pope's confirmation was required. Abraham had sought the help of the Jesuits to obtain confirmation from the Pope for his episcopal consecration, but he did not receive such confirmation until his death in 1597. After the death of Mar Abraham, Giwargis took over the administration of the church as per the late metropolitan's will and established tradition.

== See also ==
Syro-Malabar Catholic Major Archeparchy of Ernakulam–Angamaly
