= Archdiocese of Cranganore =

Eastern Catholic diocese in India (1599–1838)

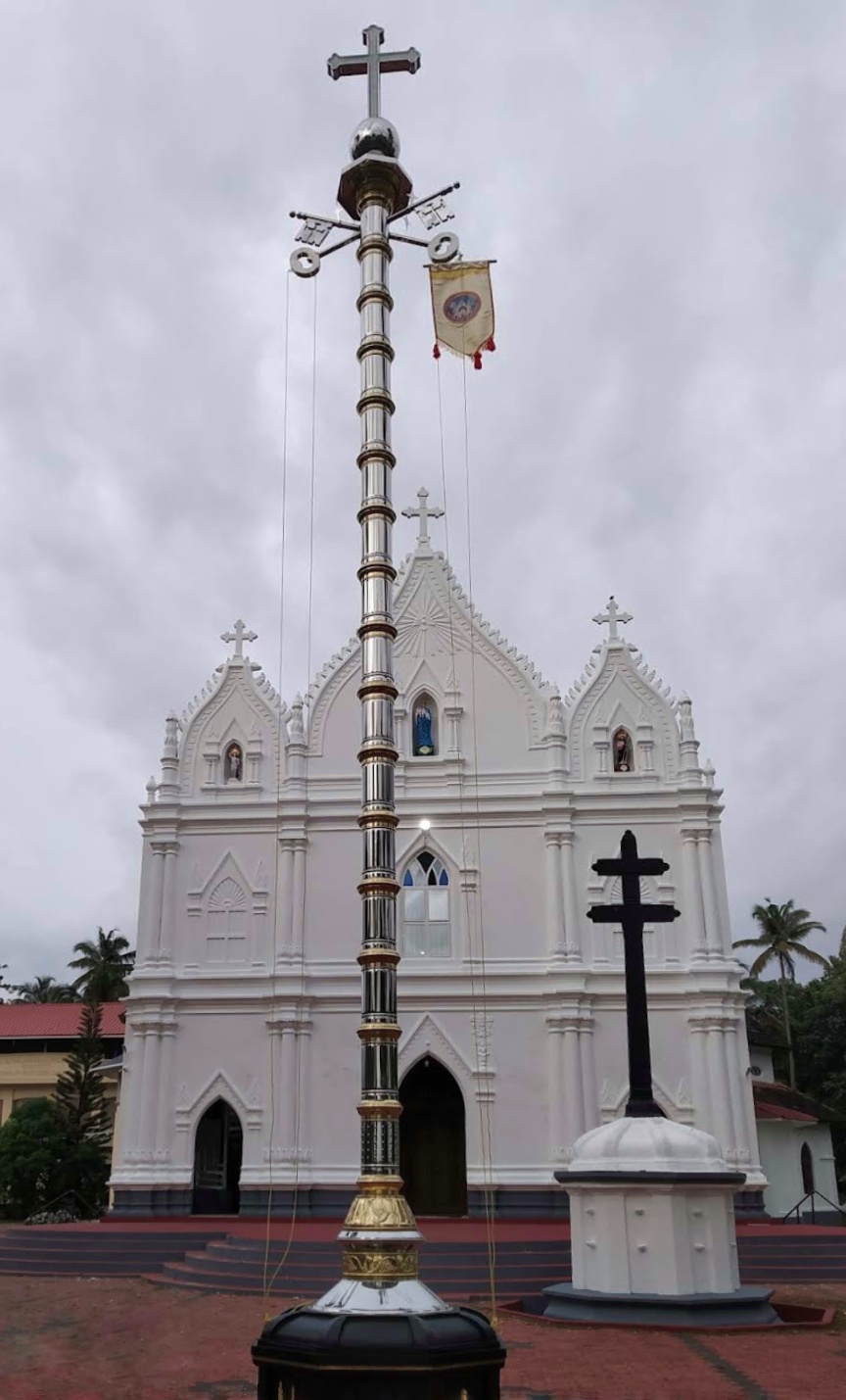
- Puthenchira Saint Mary's Syro-Malabar Church, a cathedral of the Archdiocese of Cranganore

Location
- Country: India
- Ecclesiastical province: Cranganore
- Headquarters: Angamaly, Cranganore

Information
- First holder: Francisco Roz
- Denomination: Catholic Church
- Rite: East Syriac Rite (Latinized)
- Established: 1599
- Dissolved: 1838
- Suffragans: nil

The Archdiocese of Cranganore, formerly the Diocese of Angamalé, was a Padroado archdiocese with a majority Eastern Catholic populace based in Kodungallur, Malabar, India. It employed the East Syriac Rite but was Latinised due to its being a suffragan of the Portuguese Padroado's Archdiocese of Goa.

== History ==
The archdiocese was a product of Synod of Diamper held in the Chaldean Catholic Archdiocese of Angamaly in 1599. It operated first as the Archdiocese of Angamalé and was under the East Syriac Rite, but was Latinised due to its being a suffragan of the Portuguese Padroado's Archdiocese of Goa. The name was changed to the Archdiocese of Cranganore in 1600, before the consecration of its first bishop.

Its headquarters was first at St. Hormis Church, Angamaly and was soon moved to St. Thomas Church, Cranganore Fort where it remained until 1662 and then at Puthenchira Church for more than a century. Mar Paremmakkal Thoma Kathanar, administrator of the diocese moved its headquarters to Vadayar due to invasion of Tipu Sultan. The archdiocese was dissolved in 1838.

== Bishops and hierarchs after the Synod of Diamper ==
=== Diocese of Angamalé ===
- Francis Ros, S.J. (Francisco Rodríguez; 15 Dec 1599 - 25 Jan 1601 Appointed but not consecrated)

=== Archdiocese of Cranganore ===
- Francis Ros, S.J. (Francisco Rodríguez; 25 Jan 1601 - 18 Feb 1624 Died)
- Etienne de Brito, S.J. (18 Feb 1624 - 2 Dec 1641 Died)
- Francisco Garcia Mendes, S.J. (2 Dec 1641 - 3 Sep 1659 Died)
- Mar Alexander Parambil (1 Feb 1663 - 16 July 1685)
- Jerome de São Tiago, O.S.B. (8 Jan 1689 - ? Resigned before consecration)
- Didacus Álvares (19 Apr 1694 - 30 Dec 1697 Resigned)
- João Ribeiro (archbishop), S.J. (5 Dec 1701 - 24 Jan 1716 Died)
- Antonio Pimentel (archbishop), S.J. (20 Jan 1721 - 6 Mar 1752 Died)
- João Luis Vasconcellos, S.J. (6 Mar 1752 - 11 Oct 1754 Died)
- Salvator dos Reis, S.J. (19 Jul 1756 - 7 Apr 1777 Died)
- Kariattil Mar Iousep (16 Dec 1782 - 9 Sep 1786 Died)
  - Paremmakkal Thomas (Administrator) (1786 - 1799)
- Teodoro Botelho Homen Bernardes (26 Aug 1806 Confirmed - )
- Paulo a Santo Tomas de Aquino, O.P. (17 Dec 1819 - 19 Dec 1823 Died)
- José Joaquim de Oliveira Carvalho (da Imaculada Conceição Amarante), O.F.M. Obs. (19 Dec 1825- 1835 Died)
