= Francisco Ros =

First Latin Archbishop of Archdiocese of Angamaly-Cranganore in South India

The Most Reverend Francisco Ros SJ
- Archbishop of Angamaly-Cranganore
- Native name: Francisco Ros, SJ
- Archdiocese: Angamaly-Cranganore
- Elected: 1599
- In office: 1601 January 28 – 1624 February 18

Orders
- Ordination: 1584
- Consecration: 1601 by Archbishop Aleixo de Menezes

Personal details
- Born: 1559 Girona, Catalonia
- Died: 18 February 1624 (aged 64–65) Cranganore
- Buried: Cranganore

Francisco Ros, S.J (1559–1624) was a Jesuit prelate who served as the first Archbishop of Angamaly-Cranganore, associated with the Saint Thomas Christians in the early modern Malabar in South India.

== Introduction ==
Ros was a Catalan Jesuit who arrived in India in 1584. He learned Syriac while he was in Goa and Malabar and became the professor of the semitic languages in the seminary of Vaipikotta. He was consecrated bishop of Angamaly by Archbishop Aleixo de Menezes in 1601. His See was later transferred to Cranganore and he was elevated as the Archbishop of Angamaly-Cranganore. Dom Francis Ros expired on 18 February 1624 and in the old church of North Paravur Kattakkavu, a monument is built for Ros in the sanctuary of the church.

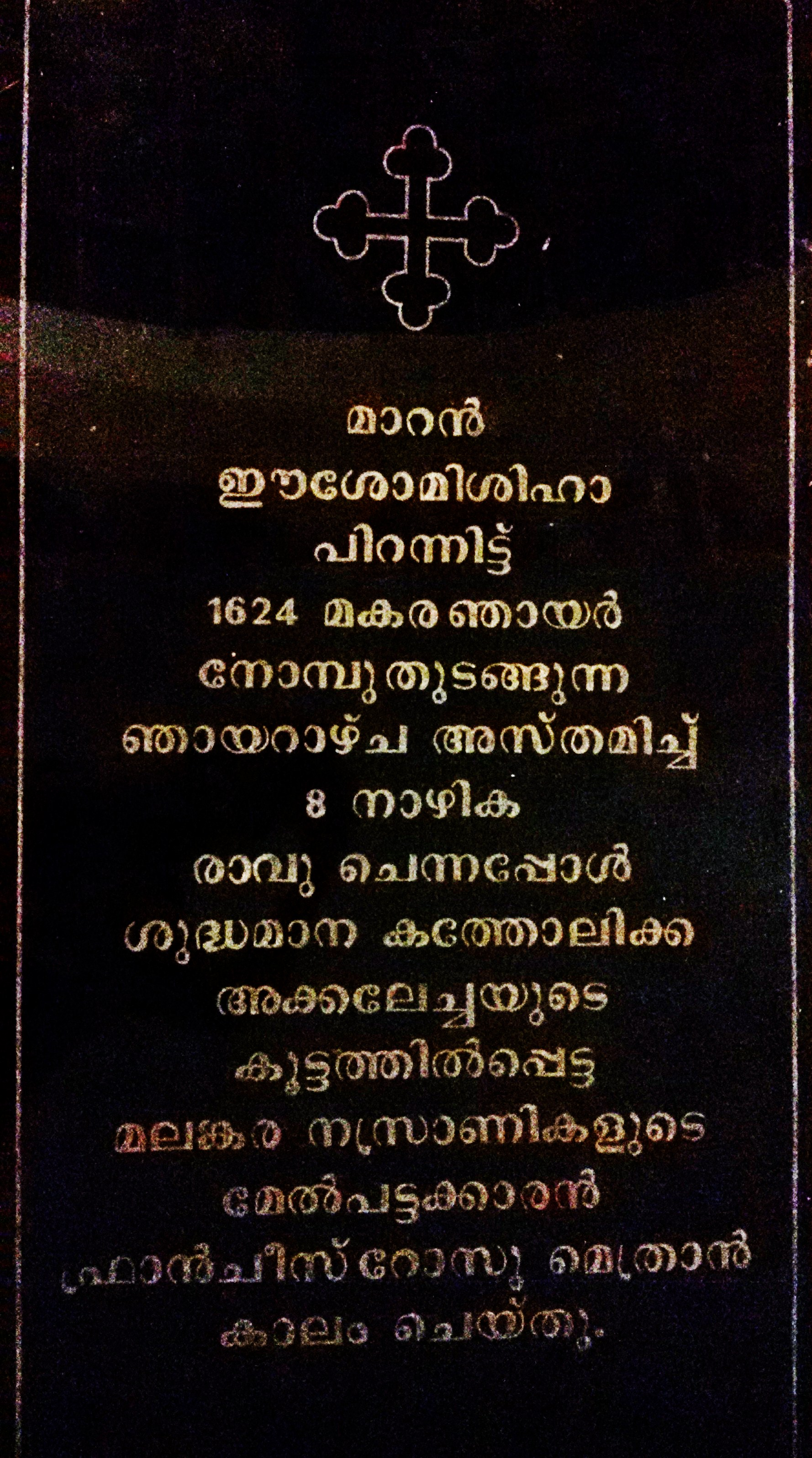
Monument built in the sanctuary of the old St. Thomas Church in North Paravur, in honour of Dom Francisco Ros, S.J, the first Latin Archbishop of Angamaly Cranganore

== His mission among the St. Thomas Christians ==
Francisco Ros started his mission among the Christians of St. Thomas at the end of 1585, after the Third Provincial Congregation that held in Goa. His first mission was to assist Archbishop Abraham of Angamaly to bring into effect the directives of the Provincial Council (1585).

== Francisco Ros, the Archbishop of Angamaly-Cranganore ==
Francisco Ros was named the bishop of Angamaly, immediately after the Synod of Diamper that held in 1599. Ros was the successor of Mar Abraham of Angamaly, the Metropolitan of All-India. Ros convoked the Second Synod of Angamaly on 7 December 1603, and the synod resolved three issues that emerged among the Thomas Christians, following the Synod of Diamper.
