= Kadavil Chandy =

17th century syriacist and Saint Thomas Christian church leader

- Vicar General of the Archdiocese of Cranganore
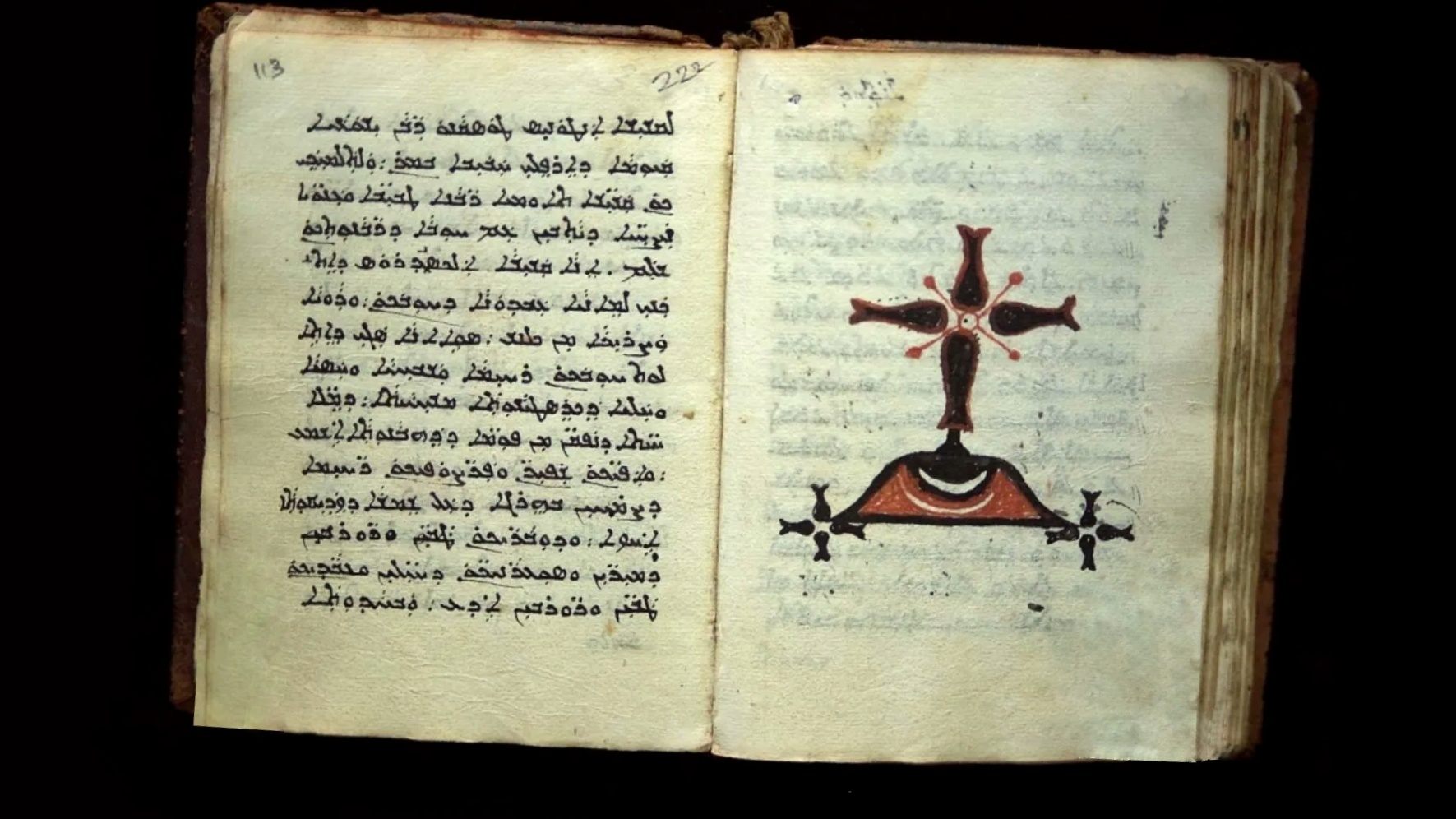
- manuscript of one of Kadavil Chandy's syriac hymns
- Appointed: by Palliveettil Chandy
- Successor: Givargis of Saint John

Kadavil Chandy Kathanar (c. 1588-1673), also known as Alexander the Indian (Syriac: ܐܲܠܟܣܲܢܕܪܘܿܣ ܗ̤ܢܕܘܿܝܐ, romanized: Alaksandros hendwāyā) was a Kathanar (priest) and a celebrated scholar, orator, hymnographer and syriacist from the Saint Thomas Christian community in India. He was a prominent face of the Saint Thomas Christians and lead their Catholic faction during a turbulent period of divisions in the community after the Coonan Cross Oath of 1653. He was from Kaduthuruthy, Kottayam in Kerala state of India. He often reacted vehemently against the colonial Padroado latin subjugation over his community and resisted their ecclesiastical and cultural dominance. He was widely reputed for his knowledge in Syriac language and literature, and was often praised, both among his own community and the European missionaries who wrote about him in their letters addressed to the Portuguese monarch and to the Pope. His acrostic poems propagated even among West Asia's Syriac-speaking communities. Although he stood against the Latin colonialists, he commanded respect from the Portuguese and the local Hindu kings alike.

== Name ==
His name, Chandy (Chāṇṭi), is a Malayalam adaptation of the short form for 'Alexander'. The Portuguese missionaries often used the nickname Alexander the Indian. This nickname is noted in Mannanam Syr 63, a 336-page eighteenth century manuscript that is currently archived in Saint Joseph’s Monastery of the Carmelites of Mary Immaculate (CMI), at Mannanam, Kerala. The Syriac term for India is Hendo. Similarly, the term that denotes Indian (or pertaining to India) in Syriac literature is hendwāya. Meanwhile, the copyist has also used the Syriac equivalent of Chandy's house name, l'mēnāyā (lit."connected to the port", or “near the jetty”), for Kadavil.

== Biography ==
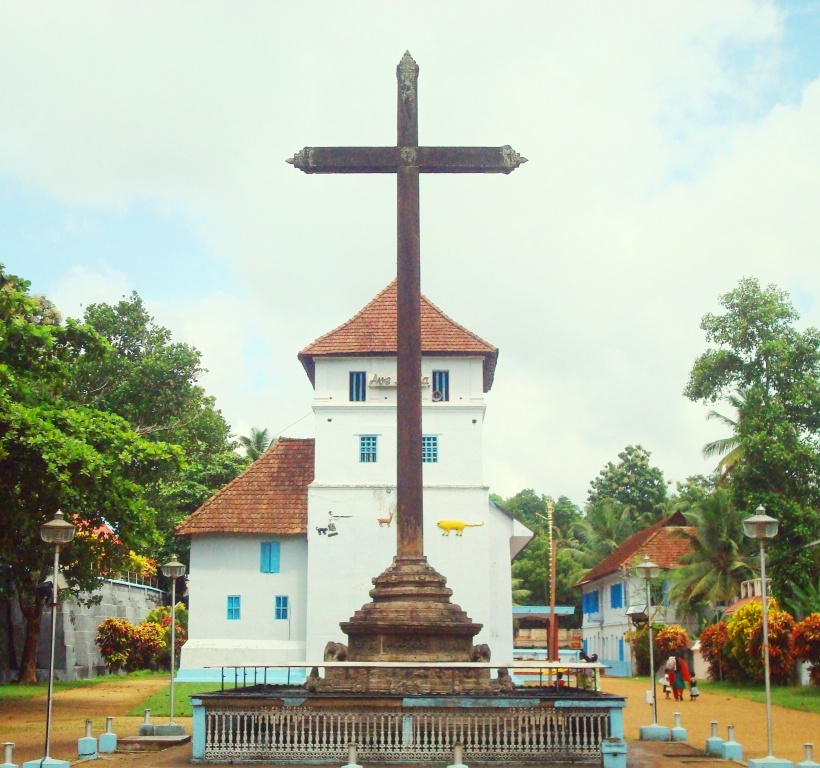
Kaduthuruthy Church

Chandy was born in 1588 into the Kadavil family of Kaduthuruthy. Many of the members of his family were priests. His friendly relations with the Rajah of Purakkad shows that he must be of aristocratic origins. He was enrolled into deaconate in the Vaippikotta Seminary. There he received his clerical training and he mastered the basics of humanist training and theology. His further studies was under Francisco Ros (during c. 1601-1624), the Padroado Archbishop of Cranganore-Angamaly, who was a linguistic genius, an excellent Syriacist and fluent in Malayalam.

However, he had a troublesome relationship with Stephen Britto (during c. 1624-1641), the successor of Fransisco Ros. Brito often employed incompetent European teachers to teach Syriac at the Vaippikotta Seminary. Britto even excommunicated Chandy for several years. The relationship between the Saint Thomas Christians and Jesuits reached its breaking point after 1641 during the archiepiscopate of Francis Garcia Mendes (d. c. 1659). Parambil Thoma, the archdeacon of the community, was often in conflict with Garcia. Beginning in 1645, the continuous conflict started escalating, with Chandy taking the side of the Archdeacon. Therefore, the Saint Thomas Christian priests wrote a petition and presented it to the Portuguese viceroy Dom Philip Mascarenhas in 1645, complaining about the abuses that face from their ecclesiastical administrators. The petition also mentions Kadavil Chandy as the most capable candidate for teaching Syriac in the Seminary. The petition thus explains the reason behind the hostility between Chandy and Britto.

István Perczel, a leading expert on the Saint Thomas Christians, observes as follows:

"The stories of the short-lived Congregation of Saint Thomas and of this petition shed an interesting light on the combination of Latinisation and racism that triggered conflicts between the Europeans and a highly learned local elite, who were revolting not against the Catholic faith itself but rather against these twin social tendencies. "

In 1652, Chandy warned the archbishop of the impending schism. However, Garcia was adamant in his attitude towards them. On c. 1653 January 3, the Saint Thomas Christians held a protest against the ecclesiastical subjugation from Garcia and the Portuguese Padroado Jesuits that came to be known as the Coonan Cross Oath. However, following the Coonan Cross Oath, there were some letters circulated claiming that they had been sent by Ahathalla. The authenticity of these letters is not clear. Some are of the opinion that these letters might be forged by Anjilimoottil Itty Thommen Kathanar, an old priest and the vicar of the Kallissery Knanaya Church who was a skilled Syriac writer. One such letter was read at a meeting at Edappally on 5 February 1653 by Kadavil Chandy Kathanar which gave the Archdeacon Thomas far-reaching jurisdictional power. Subsequently, was made one of the four advisors given to Archdeacon and he likewise defended Thomas’s episcopal consecration on 22 May 1653 in Alangad based on another letter attributed to Ahathalla. Thus, Thomas was proclaimed bishop at Alangad by twelve priests, and took the title Thoma I Soon, the Pope sent Propaganda fide led by an Italian Carmelite missionary, Joseph Maria Sebastiani, in an objective to reconcile the revolted Saint Thomas Christians with the Catholic Church. Sebastiani could easily convince a large number of Syrian Christians including Thoma I's advisors Parampil Chandy Kathanar and Kadavil Chandy Kathanar that the ordination of the archdeacon by the priests was not in accordance with canon laws. As the validity of Thoma I's consecration was questioned, he began to lose followers. In the meantime, Sebastiani returned to Rome and was ordained as bishop by Pope on 15 December 1659. Joseph Sebastiani returned to Kerala in 1661 and within a short time period he restored most of the churches that had been with Thoma I to Rome. Thus, by 1663, 84 of the 116 churches in existence were in favor of Sebastiani, leaving only 32 churches in favor of Thoma I.

However in 1663, with the conquest of Cochin by the Dutch, the control of the Portuguese on the Malabar coast was lost. The Dutch declared that all the Portuguese missionaries had to leave Kerala. Before leaving Kerala, Sebastiani consecrated Parampil Chandy as the bishop of the Thomas Christians who adhered to the Church of Rome at Kaduthuruthy Knanaya Valiypally on February 1, 1663.

Thoma I, meanwhile sent requests to the Jacobite Church of Antioch to receive canonical consecration as bishop. In 1665, Abdul Jaleel, a bishop sent by the Syrian Orthodox Patriarch of Antioch Ignatius ʿAbdulmasīḥ I, arrived in India and he consecrated Thoma canonically as a bishop. This led to the first lasting formal schism in the Saint Thomas Christian community. Thereafter, the faction affiliated with the Catholic Church under Parampil Chandy was designated as Pazhayakuttukar, or "Old Allegiance", while the branch affiliated with Parambil Thoma was called the Puthankuttukar, or "New Allegiance". The visits of prelates from the Syriac Orthodox Church of Antioch to the faction that was led by Thoma continued since then and this led to gradual replacement of the East Syriac Rite liturgy with the West Syriac Rite and the faction affiliated to the Miaphysite Christology of the Oriental Orthodox Communion. The Pazhayakuttukar (Syrian Catholics) continued with their original East Syriac Rite traditions.

Kadavil Chandy, at the age of seventy-five became the Vicar General of Parampil Chandy, the bishop of the Catholic Saint Thomas Christians. He remained in the position until 1673 when he was succeeded by George of Saint John. It is safe to assume that he died at or shortly after 1673.

== Works ==
=== The memra on the Holy Qurbana ===
One of the surviving poems composed by Chandy is preserved in the aforementioned manuscript, Mannanam Syr 63, of the Monastery at Mannanam. This manuscript has an acrostic poem by Chandy in its folios 146r to 157v. The manuscript was copied (copying was completed on February 9, 1734) by Pilippose bar Thomas Kraw Yambistha (Syriac, for “on dry land”, Malayalam Karayil) and completed on February 9, 1734. The copyist was part of the parish of Marth Mariam Church at Kallūṛkkāṭû (Kalloorkkad, present day Champakkulam), Alappuzha, Kerala. This manuscript has the East Syriac propria of prayers for Canonical hours and it starts those for the Sundays of the East Syriac liturgical season of Śūbārā. The poem’s title, possibly given by the copyist, reads: Mēmra dawīd l'qaśīśā aleksandrōs hendwāyā deskannī l'mēnāyā d'al qurbān m'śīhā, nemmar b'qal sāgdīnan (Syriac, lit."Poetic homily by Father Priest Elder Alexander the Indian, who is called ‘At the Port’ (Kadavil), about the sacrifice of Christ (Holy Qurbana), in the tune of Sāgdīnan”). The title of the poem also makes it evident that the poem is composed in the meter and melody of 'Sāgdīnan', a popular Syriac hymn of the Saint Thomas Christians. 'Sāgdīnan' is the last stanza of Bṛīk Hannāna, the East Syriac christological hymn composed by Babai the Great.

Joseph J. Palackal, an Indic musicologist who has studied the poem, explains its rhyming scheme as follows:

"There are 22 strophes, one for each letter in the Syriac alphabet. There are twelve syllables in each verse, with rhyme on the ultimate syllable. The rhyming syllable is rēś, the twentieth letter in the alphabet. The first strophe begins in the middle of the seventh line on folio 146, on ālap, the first letter of the Syriac alphabet".

== Sources ==
- Brock, Sebastian P. (2011). "Thomas Christians". In Sebastian P. Brock; Aaron M. Butts; George A. Kiraz; Lucas Van Rompay (eds.). Gorgias Encyclopedic Dictionary of the Syriac Heritage: Electronic Edition. Gorgias Press.
- P. J. Thomas (1989). Malayāḷasāhityawum kṛistyānikaḷum Malayalam Literature and Christians 3rd ed. with an appendix by Scaria Zacharia. Kottayam: D. C. Books. pp. 36, 143, 149.
- Joseph J. Palackal. "SYRO MALABAR CHURCH JESUS & INDIA A CONNECTION THROUGH ARAMAIC LANGUAGE AND MUSIC".
- Emmanuel Thelly (2004). "Syriac manuscripts in Mannanam Library". Journal of Eastern Christian Studies. 56: 257–270. doi:10.2143/JECS.56.1.578706.
- Vellian, Jacob (1986). Symposium on Knanites. Syrian Church Series. Vol. 12. Jyothi Book House.
- Neill, Stephen (2004) [1984]. A History of Christianity in India: The Beginnings to AD 1707. Cambridge: Cambridge University Press. ISBN 9780521548854.
