= Anjilimoottil Itty Thommen Kathanar =

Anjilimoottil Itty Thommen Kathanar (d. 10 May 1659) was a Kathanar (Syriac priest) of the Knanaya community of Kerala during the time of Portuguese persecution. Together with Arch Deacon Thoma Kathanar (later Mar Thoma I), he led the Malankara Church during the turbulent times towards the end of the Portuguese Padroado. In particular, he gave leadership to a crowd of about 25,000 members of the community at Mattancherry during the open revolt against the Portuguese in 1653 following the capture of the Syrian Bishop Ahatallah. The incident led to the Coonan Cross Oath.

== Aftermath of the Coonan Cross Oath ==
After the Coonan Cross Oath, Thommen organized an important meeting of the Saint Thomas Christian community, at Alangadu Church. This meeting made the historic decision to administer the Malankara church independent of the Portuguese Padroado or Roman Catholic prelates. In order to take over the administration of the church, the meeting also decided to form a council of four senior Kathanars willing to support Archdeacon Thomas. Apart from Itty Thommen, the members of this council were:

- Kadavil Chandy Kathanar
- Palliveettil Chandy Kathanar
- Vengoor Geevarghese Kathanar

However, the Carmelite missionaries who replaced the jesuits to convince all the three of these Kathanars, to reaffirm their allegiance to the Catholic Church.

== Death ==
Kathanar died on 10 May 1659 (Medam 27, 834 ME) and he was interred at St. Mary's Knanaya Jacobite Syrian Church (Knanaya Valiapally), Kallisserry where he had been the vicar.
