= Puthankoor =

Historical West Syriac Saint Thomas Christian faction

Saint Thomas Christian denominational family tree. Puthankoottukar represented in shades of violet, red and yellow

The Puthankoottukar (പുത്തൻകൂറ്റുകാർ, Puttankūṯṯukāṟ, New Allegiance) or the Puthankoor faction is the faction of the Saint Thomas Christian community in South India which remained unwilling to restore ties with the Catholic Church and the Pope, after the united community broke the Portuguese padroado Catholic hegemony through the Coonan Cross Oath in 1653. They instead chose to align with the Syriac Orthodox Church of Antioch and organised themselves as the 'Malankara Church' under Archdeacon Thoma Parambil, thereby developing a long standing relationship with the Syriac Orthodox Church since 1665.

== Early history ==
=== Church of the East ===
Christians in India were part of the Church of the East up until the late 16th century. Following the schism of 1552 in the Church of the East, when Monk Yohannan Sulaqa and his followers joined the Catholic Church, forming the Chaldean Catholic Church, both the traditional and the Chaldean Catholic factions sent bishops to India. The first of the Chaldean Catholic bishops in India was Yawsep Sulaqa, the brother of Yohannan Sulaqa. Another bishop, Abraham, arrived in India as a traditionalist bishop but later joined the Catholic faction.

=== Synod of Diamper and Coonan Cross Oath ===
Abraham was to become the last Chaldean bishop to govern the undivided Saint Thomas Christian community. Following his death in 1597, the Portuguese missionaries, who had arrived along with the colonial traders to India, started a vigorous and comprehensive process of Latinisation in liturgy and discipline among the local Christians and prevented other East Syriac bishops from reaching Malabar. These efforts culminated in the so-called Synod of Diamper (1599), the local clergy was forced to reject the Chaldean Catholic patriarch of Babylon, who in fact was in full communion with Rome at that time, as a Nestorian heretic and schismatic. The Portuguese, who controlled the maritime routes to India at that time, continued to block the arrival of eastern bishops. They occupied the diocesan administration of the Saint Thomas Christians and deprived the archdeacon of his traditional rights. The wait of Syrian Christians for a Syrian bishop to restore their past ecclesiastical dignity and autonomy seemingly came to an end in the arrival of Ahattalla, a West Syriac bishop. But the Portuguese prevented Ahattalla from entering Malabar, despite the prayers of Archdeacon Thoma Parambil and the local Christians in 1653. This provoked a strong reaction from the local Christians, led by the archdeacon, in the form of the Coonan Cross Oath. Although the exact wording of the oath is disputed, its effect was the severing of the relationship between the local Christians and the Portuguese and the proclamation of the archdeacon as their new metropolitan with the title 'Mar Thoma'.

=== Schism with Pazhayakoottukar ===
In 1656, Pope sent an Italian 'Discalced' Carmelite priest named Giuseppe Maria Sebastiani with the aim of bringing back the Saint Thomas Christians who had separated themselves from the jurisdiction of the existing Catholic bishop through the Coonan Cross Oath. In 1659, Sebastiani was appointed as Apostolic vicar of Malabar with the faculty of appointing a new bishop from the native Christians replacing the Portuguese bishop. He consecrated Chandy Parambil as the local bishop in 1663, after the Dutch, having defeated the Portuguese, banned other Europeans from operating in Malabar.

With the presence of another local and validly appointed bishop, Thoma's authority increasingly began to be contested and his many of his followers abandoned him. With this, Thomas wrote letters seeking help from other Eastern churches. In response, a Syriac Orthodox bishop named Gregorios Abdal Jalīl arrived in Malabar in 1665 and regularised Thoma's episcopacy. Succeeding Thoma, senior priests in his Pakalōmaṯṯam dynastic line took over as the leaders of the faction that remained aligned to him. They too maintained strong relations with the Syriac Orthodox Church. Over time, they adopted the West Syriac Rite instead of the old East Syriac Rite. Thus the split in the Saint Thomas Christian community solidified and those who descend from Thoma's faction came to be called Puthankoottukar (Puttankūṯṯukāṟ or 'those of the new allegiance') and those of Chandy came to be called Pazhayakoottukar (Paḻayakūṯṯukāṟ or 'those of the old allegiance').

== Malankara Jacobite Church ==
The Puthankoottukar remained unwilling to restore ties with the Catholic Church and the Pope and instead chose to align with the Syriac Orthodox Church of Antioch. They organised themselves as the 'Malankara Church' and developed a relationship with the Syriac Orthodox Church starting in 1665, when Thoma Parambil was recognised as their legitimate bishop by the Syriac Orthodox Church of Antioch. This relationship was gradually strengthened over the years and thus they changed their liturgical rite from East Syriac to West Syriac, a process which was complete by the 19th century. This also led to emergence of resentment towards the ever-growing authority of the Patriarch of Antioch in the Puthankoor Malankara Church. Thus this church suffered further divisions in the eighteenth, nineteenth and twentieth centuries, resulting in the formation of multiple Malankara churches.

== Thozhiyur Church ==
Thoma VI, later known as Dionysios I, was initially hesitant to submit to the Patriarch of Antioch and was unwilling to receive Holy Orders afresh from the Syrian Orthodox bishops as they declared his orders to be invalid. Thoma responded by trying to reunite with the Catholic Church under the Pope by collaborating with kindred spirits in the Pazhayakoor faction, such as Kariyattil Yawsep and Paremmakkal Thoma. Frustrated of his defiance, one of the Syrian Orthodox bishops from Jerusalem consecrated Kurillos as his rival in an attempt to secure their foothold in the Malankara Church. However Thoma's reunion attempt with the Catholic Church failed due to opposition from the Carmelite missionaries, and by then Thoma finally yielded to the demands and received ordination and consecration anew from the Syrian Orthodox bishops and changed to the episcopal name Dionysios I in return for their support against Metropolitan os. The dispute between Kurillos and Dionysios was decided in the latter's favour by the Travancore King and subsequently he lost the favour of Cochin King as well. This forced Kurillos to flee from the territories of both of these kings and he eventually settled in Thozhiyur in British Malabar. There he formed an independent church with a small community of believers, which became known officially as the Malabar Independent Syrian Church and colloquially as the Thozhiyur Church.

== Marthoma Church ==
A group who were in favour of the Reformed ideologies and local ecclesiastical autonomy and led by priest Palakkunnath Abraham Malpan amassed support against Dionysios Philippos and sent Deacon Mathew Palakkunnath, a nephew of Abraham Malpan, to the patriarch. The patriarch, satisfied with Mathew's knowledge in Syriac and English and his spiritual life, consecrated him the bishop for Malankara Syrians, against Dionysios Philippos who had previously assumed their leadership without his approval. Dionysios Philippos was reluctant to receive or step down from office for Athanasius, who returned to his homeland as Metropolitan appointed by the patriarch. Instead, Dionysios transferred his power to Yuyaqim Kurillos, a Syrian bishop sent by the patriarch. The dispute between Kurillos and Athanasius was brought into the court, which in 1852 decided in favour of Athanasius. Kurillos was exiled to British Malabar where he amassed support and selected Pulikkottil Joseph to be sent to the patriarch. In 1865, Pulikkottil was consecrated metropolitan as Dionysios Joseph by the patriarch and on returning, he became a rival for Athanasius.

Mathews Athanasius managed to ensure the support of the British and maintain his position. In 1868, he selected his nephew, Thomas as his heir and consecrated him as Thomas Athanasius. Pulikkottil Dionysios and his supporters appealed to Patriarch Ignatius Petros III for his direct intervention. The patriarch visited London and met with the Archbishop of Canterbury. After securing the support of the Anglican Church leadership, he arrived in India and convened the Synod of Mulanthuruthy in 1876. At this synod, Pulikkottil Dionysios was declared Malankara Metropolitan and Athanasius was anathematised for his alleged Protestant views.

Athanasius did not submit to the patriarch and declined the patriarch's invitation to the synod. He retained his position as the Malankara Metropolitan until his death in 1877 at the Kottayam Seminary, the seat of the church. He was then succeeded by Thomas Athanasius. A case was filed against Thomas Athanasius by Dionysios in the Court and both sides argued in court for a long time. In 1889, the Travancore Royal Court division bench ruled its final verdict in favor of Dionysios Joseph, considering his appointment by the Patriarch of Antioch, and Thomas Athanasius was forced relinquish his authority and to vacate the church headquarters. Those aligned with Thomas Athanasius became the Malankara Marthoma Syrian Church.

== Anglican - Puthankoor relationship ==
The relationship between the Anglican church and the Malankara Syrian Church dates to the late 18th century when the British helped Dionysios I (Thoma VI) to secure his position against his rival Bishop Abraham Kurillos Kattumangatt. It further solidified during Dionysius Joseph I's term due to the support the Anglicans offered him to overthrow Thoma XI, the last dynastic leader of the Puthenkoor, and establish himself as the Malankara Metropolitan recognised by the State. They collaborated with the Malankara Church in founding the Syrian Seminary in Kottayam and this relationship reached its peak during Dionysius Giwargis Punnathara's reign. He was succeeded by Geevarghese Mar Philoxenos II, the Thozhiyur Metropolitan and an ally of the Anglican CMS missionaries. However he had to relinquish the throne in two years and consecrate Dionysios Philippos of Cheppad as the next Malankara Metropolitan without informing the Patriarch of Antioch.

The efforts of Anglican CMS missionaries were aimed at an Anglican-inspired reformation in the Malankara Church and its eventual merger into their hierarchy. This was opposed by a large section of the Puthenkoor Thomas Christians who stood for Syrian traditionalism and loyalty to the Patriarch of Antioch. Cheppad Dionysios eventually aligned himself with them and convened a Synod at Mavelikara on 16 January 1836 where it was declared that Malankara Church would be subject to the Syrian traditions and Patriarch of Antioch. The declaration resulted in the separation of the CMS missionaries from the communion with the Malankara Church.

== Synod of Mulanthuruthy ==
The landmark event in the history of the Malankara Jacobite Syrian Orthodox Church was the Synod of Mulanthuruthy, convened by Ignatius Petros III, the Syriac Orthodox Patriarch of Antioch, in 1876, which led to its complete union with the Syriac Orthodox Church. The historical Malankara Church, which had been functioning until then under a single bishop, the Malankara Metropolitan, was divided into seven dioceses with this event, each having its own bishop. In addition to this, the Malankara Jacobite Syrian Christian Association, a general body which included clerical and lay parish representatives, was also established. Thus the modern Malankara Jacobite Syrian Orthodox Church dates to the Synod of Mulanthuruthy.

== Syro-Malankara Catholic reunion ==
=== Early attempts at reunion ===
Following the schism among the Saint Thomas Christians, there were several attempts to reunite the two factions. Almost all of them revolved around the leader of the Puthenkoor, initially belonging to the Pakalōmaṯṯam dynastic line, submitting to the authority of the Pope and reuniting both factions of the community under his leadership. However none of these attempts materialised. Due to the strong opposition from the Syriac Orthodox christans in India. The identities of each faction diverged further over the years.

=== Reunion of 1930 ===
The split in the Malankara Jacobite community in 1912 resulted in several bishops carrying out negotiations with Rome, most notably Giwargis Ivanios Panickerveettil. Panickerveettil was an erudite mystic and a key architect in the establishment of the autocephalous catholicate for the Malankara Orthodox Syrian Church in 1912. In 1930, he and bishop Yacub Theophilos formally declared themselves Catholics. They were followed by Dioscoros Thomas, a bishop from the Knanaya diocese of the patriarchal faction, and Philexinos, the Metropolitan of the Thozhiyur Church. A significant number of faithful accompanied them, into what was named the Syro-Malankara Catholic Church (SMCC).

From its beginning, the leaders of the SMCC asked for the preservation of the West Syriac Rite that they received from the Syriac Orthodox Church and they were permitted to do so with a distinct Eastern Catholic sui juris hierarchy and dioceses of their own. In 2005, Pope John Paul II elevated the SMCC to the rank of a major archiepiscopal church.

== See also ==
- Church of the East in India
- Syriac Christianity
- Cochin Jews
- Goa Inquisition
- Latin Catholics of Malabar
