= Gregorios Abdal Jaleel =

Syriac Orthodox Church Bishop

Gregorios Abdul Jaleel Saint
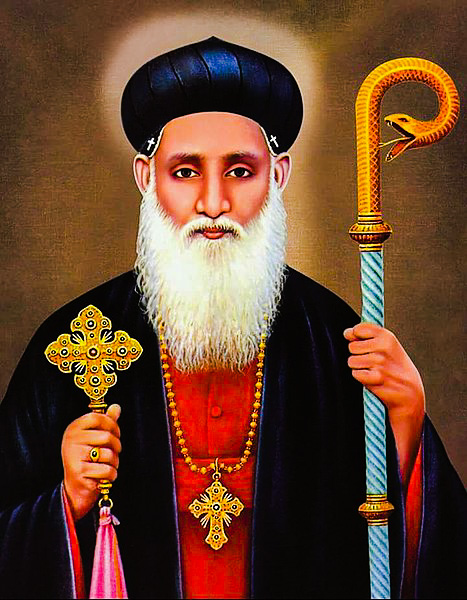

Patriarch of Jerusalem
- Born: Mosul, Iraq
- Died: 27 April 1681; North Paravur, India
- Venerated in: Syriac Orthodox Church; Oriental Orthodox Christianity
- Major shrine: St. Thomas Jacobite Syrian Church, North Paravur
- Feast: 27 April

Mor Gregorios Abdal Jaleel Bawa (died 27 April 1681) was the Syriac Orthodox Bishop of Jerusalem from 1664 until his death in 1681. He is chiefly remembered for his 1665 mission to India, by which he established ties between the Malankara Church and the Syriac Orthodox church of Antioch. He is venerated as a saint by his church.

Abdal Jaleel was born in 1605 in Mosul, Iraq and his father's name was Abdulahad. In 1653 he was ordained metropolitan bishop for the Ameed (Diyarbakir) diocese in Turkey by the Patriarch Ignatius Shamoun In 1664, he was elevated as the Metropolitan of Jerusalem with the title Gregorios. He traveled to India in 1665 to the ordination of Thoma I, archdeacon of the Malankara Nasrani community. He was the delegate of the Patriarch of the Syriac Orthodox Church to Kerala Syrian Christians. He died in India in 1681, and his remains are interred in the St. Thomas Church at North Paravur. On April 4, 2000, Patriarch Ignatius Zakka I declared Mar Gregorios Abdal Jaleel a saint.

== Mission in India ==
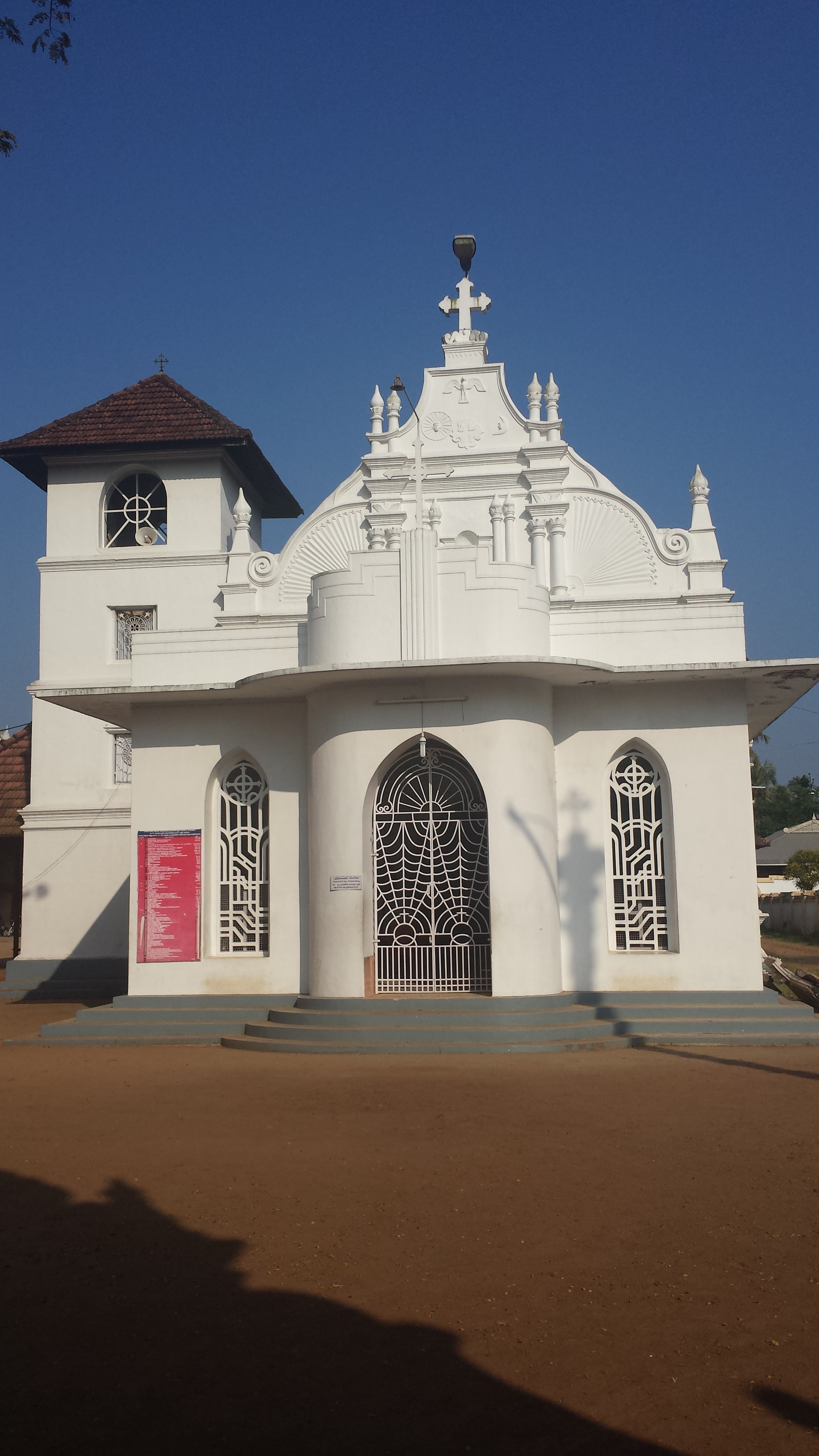
Paravur St. Thomas Jacobite Syrian Church which houses the tomb of Mar Gregorios Abdal Jaleel.

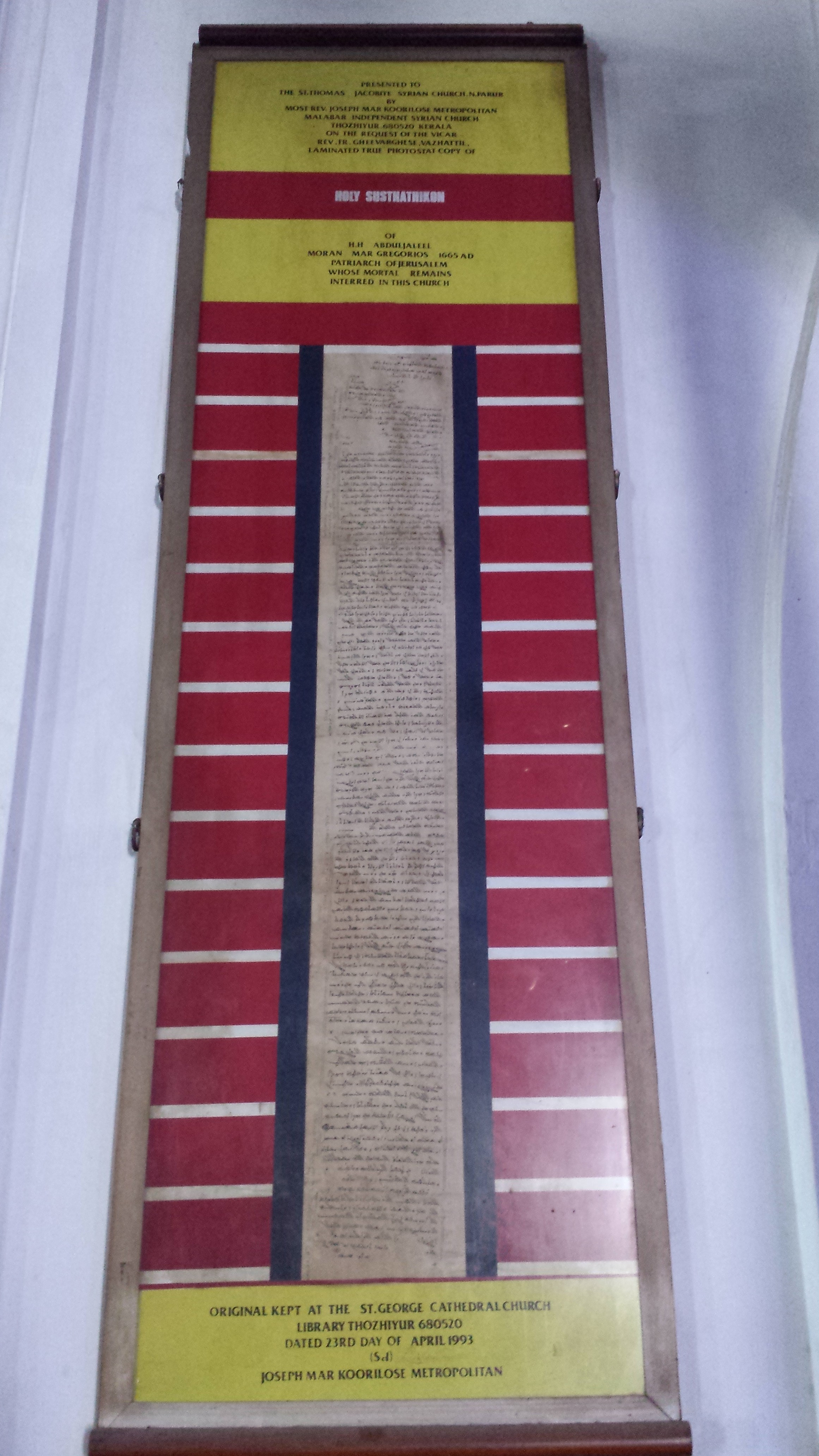
Susthathikon of Mar Gregorios Abdal Jaleel.

Thomas Christians are popularly and traditionally called Syriac Christians, a term associated with their use of liturgical rites of Syriac Christianity. The name Syriac came to refer to those Christians that were using various Syriac Rites at the very beginning of Christianity. The Syrian Christian label was also attached to the Churches in Syria, which was submitted to the ecclesiastical authority of the Church of Antioch in the ancient capital of Roman Syria. It was referred to as the Syrian Church in the epistle of St. Ignatius (the third Patriarch of Antioch), to the Romans in AD 107.

The Saint Thomas Christians were in communion with the Church of the East until their encounter with the Portuguese in 1599. Thereafter the Christians of St Thomas had been influenced by many belief streams at different points in time. These influences have later resulted in serious rifts and in the breaking down of the monolithic apostolic church into different fragments under different faith streams. They were organized as a Church in the 8th century, served by foreign bishops and with a hereditary local chief called Arkadiyokon or Archdeacon. In the 16th century the overtures of the Portuguese padroado to bring the Saint Thomas Christians into the Roman Catholic Church led to the first of several rifts in the community and the establishment of Pazhayakūr and Puthenkūr factions. Since that time further splits have occurred, and the Saint Thomas Christians are now divided into several Eastern Catholic, Oriental Orthodox, and independent bodies, each with their own liturgies and traditions.

After the Coonen Cross Oath incident, Archdeacon Parambil Thoma was ordained as bishop by the laying on of hands by twelve priests. This was considered necessary in view of the extraordinary circumstances. Appeals were sent to various Eastern Christian centers and Gregorios Abdul Jaleel Bawa of Jerusalem was the first to respond. Meanwhile, the Eastern Catholic faction was led by Bishop Parambil Chandy, supported by Kadavil Chandy Kathanar and Vengūr Givargis Kathanar.

Gregorios reached Ponnani, then an important port on the South West coast of India, in 1665. The 'Travancore State Manual' Vol II Page 187, records the arrival of Gregorios as follows - "Two years afterward, in 1665, the position of the Archdeacon Thomas altered by the arrival on this coast of a Bishop named Gregory, Patriarch of Jerusalem sent by the Jacobite Patriarch of Antioch Ignatius XXIII the quarter whence had come Ahathalla, thirteen years previously".

Knowing the prevailing political climate, he traveled further south by land in disguise until he came across some Syriac Rite Christians from the North Paravur church. He revealed his identity showing them the sthathikon from the Patriarch of Antioch. They led him to their church and sent word to others. The Archdeacon and many people rushed to the place to welcome the Bawa. Soon after, Gregorios canonically ordained the Archdeacon as Metropolitan Thoma I. Together, they traveled to various churches affirming the Orthodox faith and traditions. In 1670 March Gregorios and Thoma I together ordained Thoma II as the second Malankara Metropolitan.

An important encyclical by Gregorios dated 5th Kumbam 1668 gives us a record of the Malankara Church during the period. Referring to the Synod of Diamper, it says "Most of the early records on the faith and history of the Malankara Church prior to the arrival of Portuguese were destroyed in the aftermaths of the Synod of Diamper. They did this in order to establish a new chapter in Malankara. The ultimate aim of the Synod was to transform the Syriac Rite Christians into the Roman Catholic fold by use of force and in this process, they managed to destroy all the earlier records. The support of Portuguese military and the local Kings made their task much easier."

== Relics ==
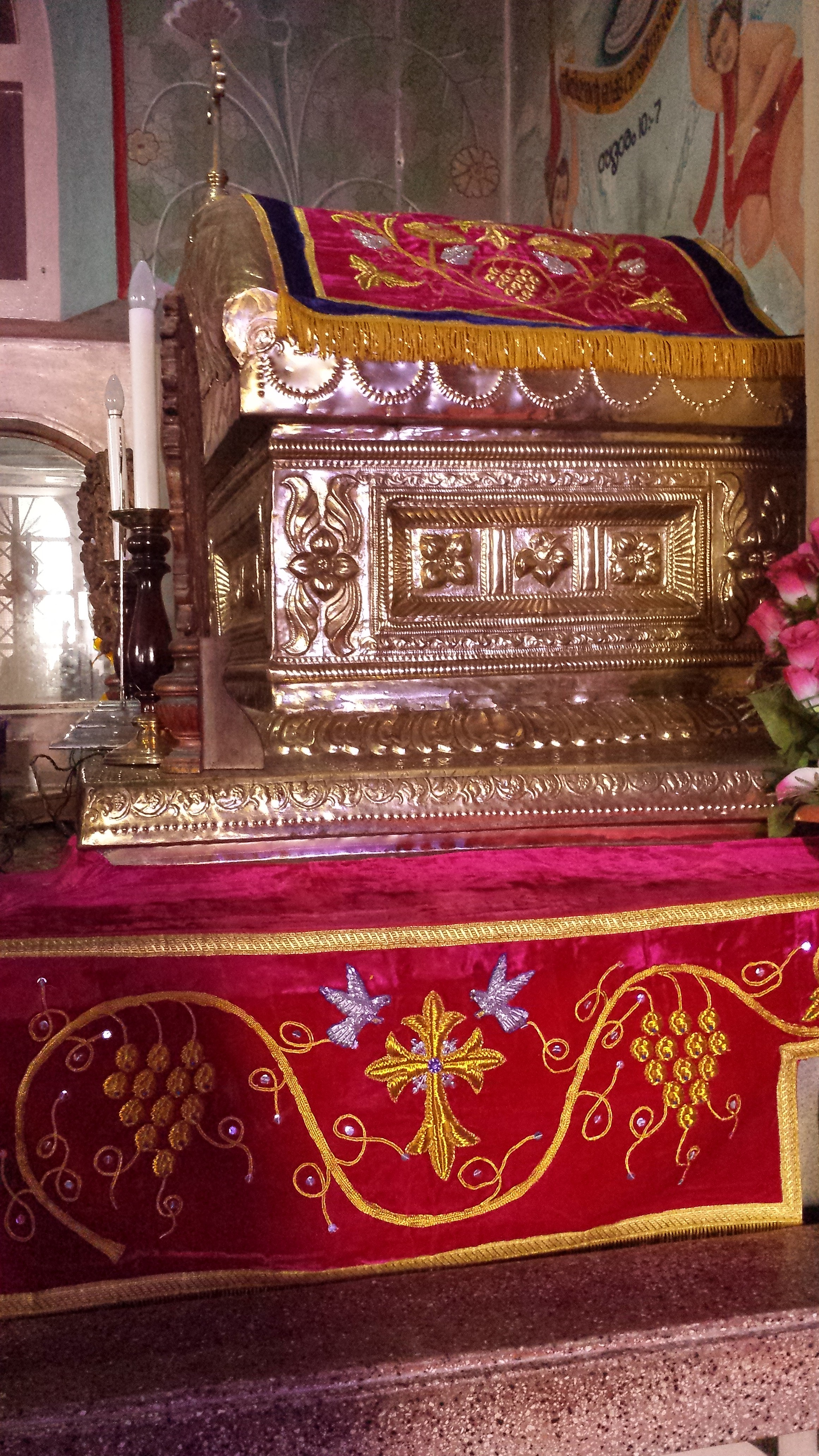
Tomb of Mar Gregorios Abdal Jaleel inside St. Thomas Jacobite Syrian Church, North Paravur.

The relics of Mor Gregorios are preserved at St. Thomas Church, North Paravur which include his vestments, a golden cross, a golden chalice, a paten set, and an Trulia worn by Mor Gregorios. The holy 'Arulikka' has 12 partitions of which 11 contain the relics of saints and the twelfth partition in the middle contains a piece of the cross on which Christ was crucified. The Chalice and Platen are still used in the Holy Qurbana celebrated on the feast of Mor Gregorios. The relics are ceremoniously taken out and exhibited for public veneration on the feast day.

== Feast ==
The Perunal (Malayalam) or Dhukrono (Syriac) of Mor Gregorios Bava is celebrated for 4 days starting from 24 April every year and culminating on the 27th. During these days, the North Paravur is declared as a festival area by the Kerala government considering the large flow of pilgrims. Thousands of pilgrims from different parts of Kerala, mostly from the northern part of Malankara, travel by foot covering many miles to reach the tomb every year.

The Feast of Mor Gregorios Abdal Jaleel is also celebrated at Elanjikal Palli in Niranam on 28 April.
