= Coonan Cross Oath =

1653 oath by members of the Saint Thomas Christians

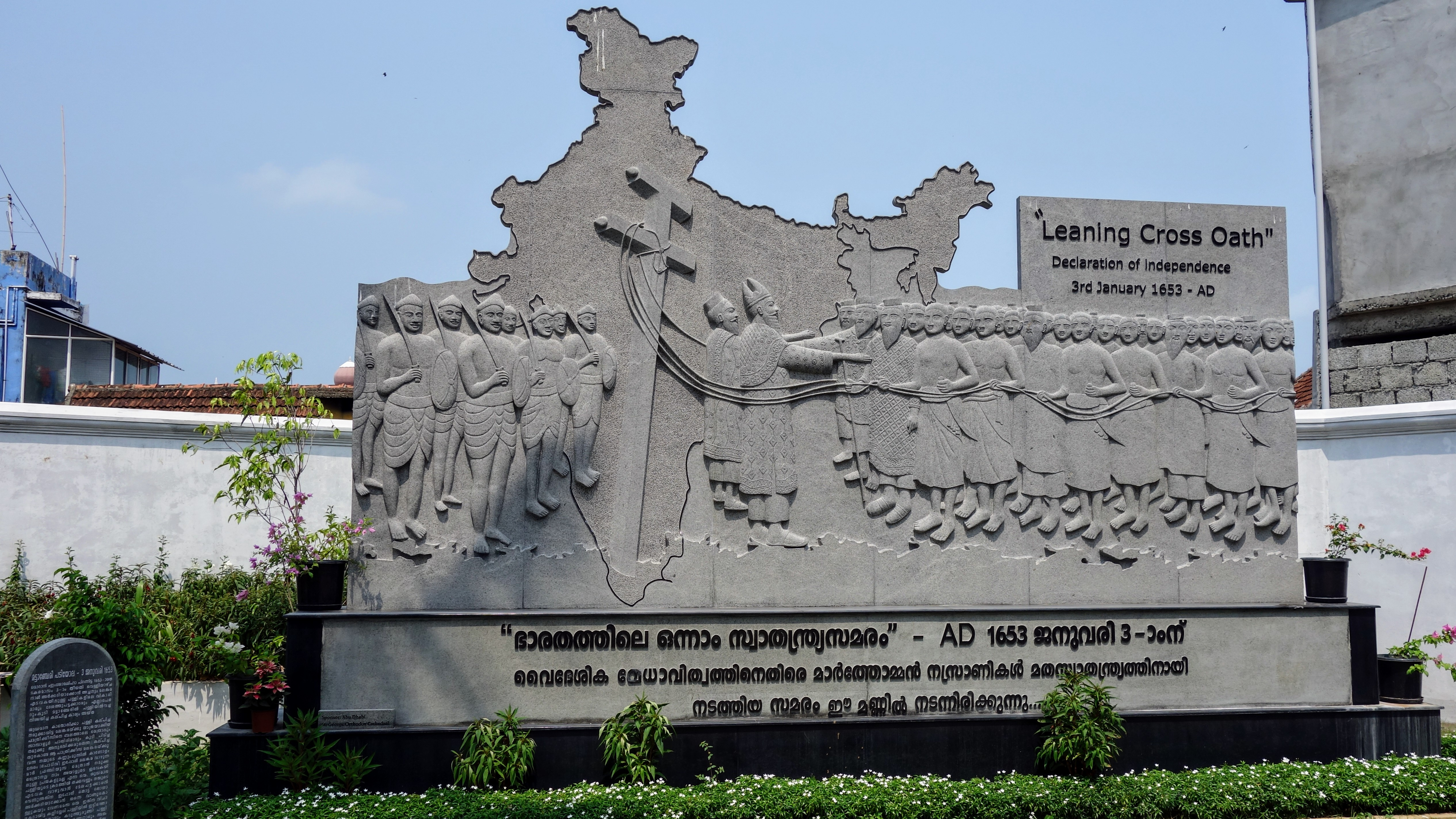
Coonan Cross Oath memorial

The Coonan Cross Oath (alternatively spelled Koonan Cross Oath), also known as the Great Oath of Bent Cross or Leaning Cross Oath, was taken on 3 January 1653 in Mattancherry by a significant portion of the Saint Thomas Christian community in the Malabar region of India. This public declaration marked their refusal to submit to the authority of the Jesuits and the Latin Catholic hierarchy, as well as their rejection of Portuguese dominance in both ecclesiastical and secular matters.

The Portuguese had established political and religious control over parts of India, seeking to enforce Latin Catholic practices upon the local Christian community, which followed its own traditions. At the Synod of Diamper in 1599, led by Archbishop Aleixo de Menezes, the Western Church imposed several changes, including the use of Portuguese archbishops, the Latin liturgy, Roman vestments, clerical celibacy, and the establishment of the Portuguese Inquisition in Goa, which also extended its jurisdiction to Cochin. The Saint Thomas Christians, whom the Portuguese derisively referred to as "Nestorians," largely resisted these latinizations, as they were seen as an infringement on their longstanding religious customs.

A key figure in this resistance was Ahatallah, a Syrian Orthodox archbishop who arrived in India and was regarded by many Saint Thomas Christians as a potential leader capable of restoring their traditional practices. His capture by Portuguese authorities, who feared his influence, and his subsequent mysterious disappearance only fueled further resistance among the Saint Thomas Christians. By 1653, dissatisfaction with the Latin Church's increasing control had grown significantly. The disappearance of Ahatallah played a direct role in prompting the Coonan Cross Oath, Which was performed under the leadership of Anjilimoottil Itty Thommen Kathanar as the community feared the complete erosion of their identity under Portuguese rule.

After the oath, Thoma I sought canonical consecration as metropolitan bishop of the Saint Thomas Christians, leading to Gregorios Abdal Jaleel's arrival in India in 1665, who regularized Thoma I's episcopal succession. This established a formal split among the Saint Thomas Christians into two factions: the Pazhayakuttukar, or "Old Allegiance," loyal to the Catholic Church under Bishop Palliveettil Chandy, and the Puthankuttukar, or "New Allegiance," led by Thoma I. The Pazhayakuttukar branched into the modern Syro-Malabar Church and Chaldean Syrian Church, while the Puthankuttukar branched into the Malankara Mar Thoma Syrian Church, Jacobite Syrian Christian Church, the Malankara Orthodox Syrian Church, and the Syro-Malankara Catholic Church.

== Background ==
Saint Thomas Christians of Malabar was in communion with the Church of the East from 300 to 1599 by Portuguese. Saint Thomas Christians looked to Catholicos-Patriarch of the Church of the East for ecclesiastical authority. Although the bishops from the Middle East were the spiritual rulers of the Church, the general administration of the Church of Kerala was governed by the indigenous Archdeacon. The Archdeacon was the head of Saint Thomas Christians. Even when there were more than one foreign bishop, there was only one Archdeacon for the entire Saint Thomas Christian community. However, with the establishment of Portuguese power in parts of India, the clergy of that empire, in particular members of the Society of Jesus (Jesuits), attempted to Latinise the Indian Christians.

The Portuguese started a Latin Church diocese in Goa (1534) and another at Cochin (1558), and sought to bring the Saint Thomas Christians under the jurisdiction of the Portuguese padroado and into the Latin Church of the Catholic Church. A series of synods, including the 1585 Synod of Goa, were held, which introduced Latinized elements to the local liturgy. In 1599 Aleixo de Menezes, Archbishop of Goa, led the Synod of Diamper, which finally brought the Saint Thomas Christians formally under the authority of the Latin Archdiocese of Goa.

The independence of the ancient Church of Saint Thomas Christians was rescinded. The padroado rule of the Portuguese was only momentary, for the resentment and desire to regain independence were very real among the Thomas Christians. Their leader Archdeacon Thomas had come to the conclusion that there was no remedy for their sufferings other than the introduction of an Eastern bishop according to their tradition. He wrote letters to the Coptic patriarch in Alexandria, the Jacobite patriarch of Antioch asking them to provide the necessary help. None of the letters was answered.

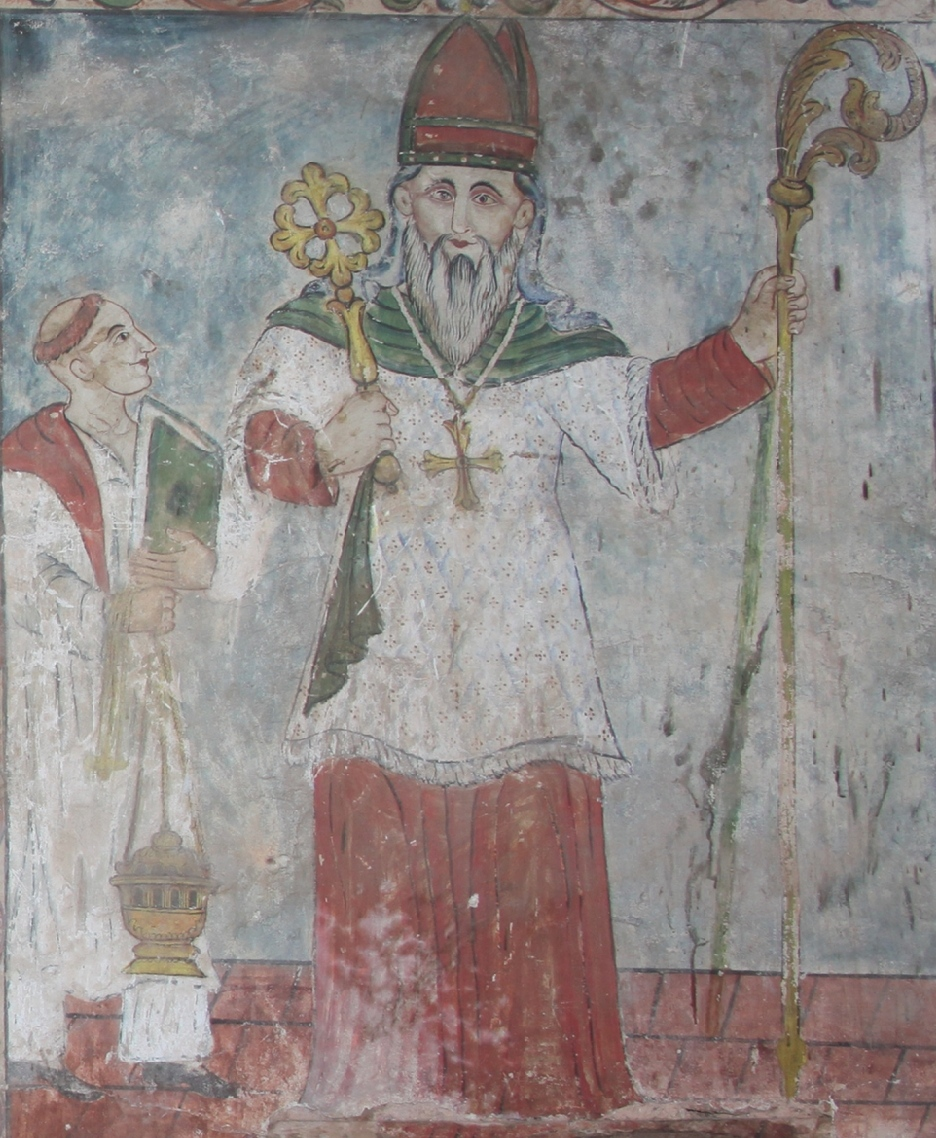
Mural of Archdeacon Giwargis of Christ in Latin vestments from the Angamaly Cheriyapally

In 1652, the Syrian prelate Ahatallah visited India. He is said to have landed at Surat and thence came to Mylapore, where he was arrested by the Jesuits on 3 August 1652. While at Mylapore, Ahatalla met two Syrian Christian deacons, viz: Chengannur ltty and Kuravilangad Kizhakkedath Kurien from Malankara, who were on a pilgrimage to the tomb of St. Thomas and sent a letter through them to the Church of Malankara saying:

Behold, I Ignatius, Patriarch of All India and China, send to you a letter through the clerics who came here from your place. When you have read this letter diligently send me two priests and forty men. If however, you wish to send them from your place, send them cautiously, quickly and soon, so that seeing your people they would release me without hindrance. I came to the city of Mylapore thinking that many people come here, and that priests would get me to your place of the Indias. In the year 1652 of our Lord, in the month of August, on Monday, I arrived in Mylapore in the monastery of the Jesuits. In the same monastery I stay, and they help me very much; may their reward increase here and there. Peace be with them, with you, and with us now and always. Amen. I, Ignatius, Patriarch of All India and China.

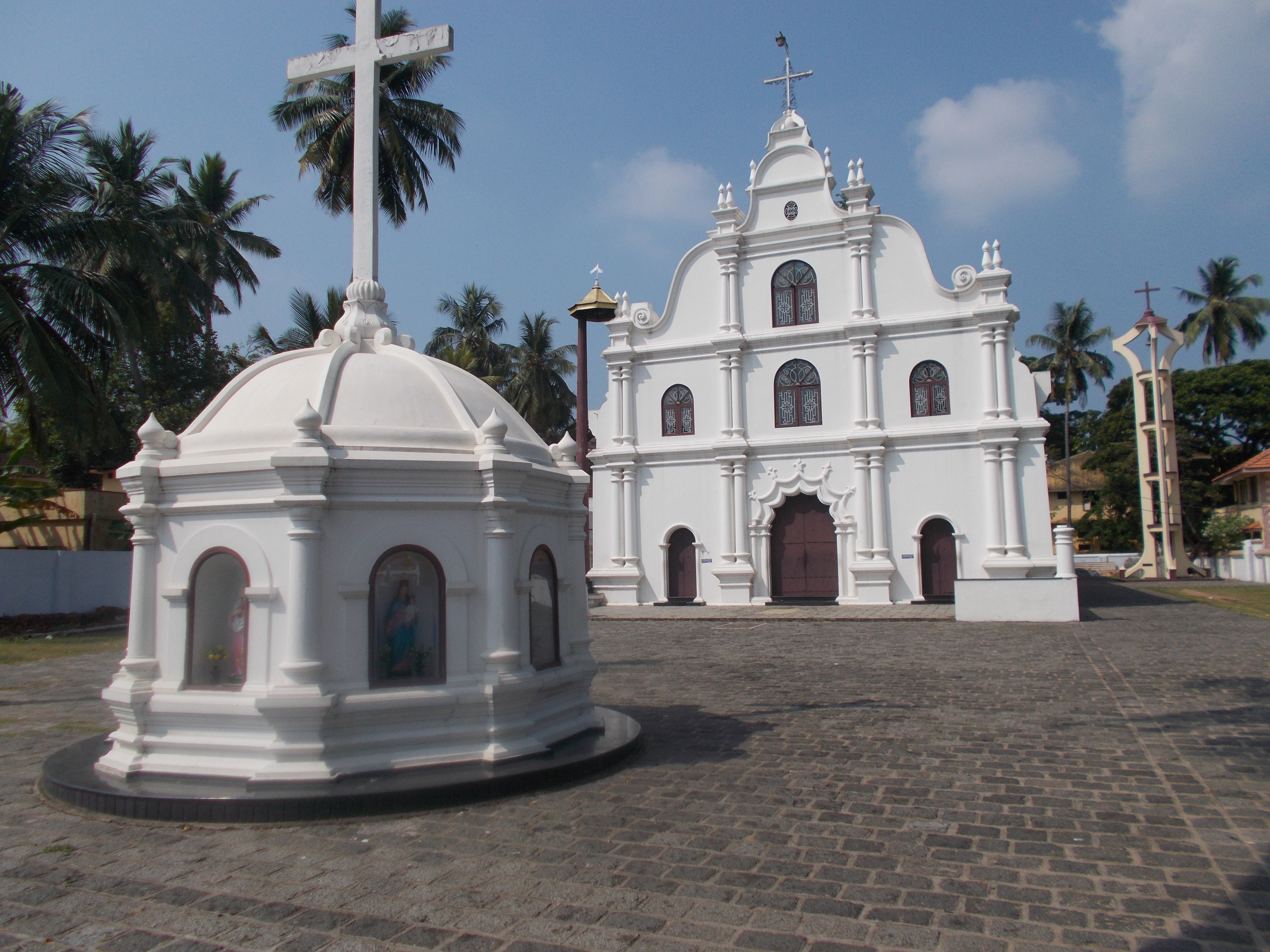
The church of Our Lady of Life, Mattancherry

He was taken on board a Portuguese ship at Madras bound for Goa. En route, it landed at Cochin. Thomas Christians heard of the arrival of the ship at Cochin. The Archdeacon with a large number of Priests and several thousands of Saint Thomas Christians assembled at Mattancherry Cochin; their efforts to visit Ahatallah when the fleet arrived in Cochin intensified but ultimately, they were not fruitful. Several letters were sent to all the civil and religious authorities in Cochin, for at least an opportunity to visit Ahatallah, to examine his credentials and to verify his identity, promising that if he was found an imposter, they would be the first to press for his punishment. Due to the staunch and intransigent opposition of Archbishop Garcia and the Jesuit priests it did not happen. They informed him that the ship had already sailed for Goa. It was claimed that a rumor was also spread at this time that Ahatallah was drowned by the Portuguese. What happened to Ahatallah in the midst of the Arabian Sea is still a mystery. The earlier historians have mentioned that Ahatallah was drowned by the Portuguese. Some other writers state that Ahatallah was not killed in 1653 and he was sent as a prisoner to Lisbon where he died a natural death in the prison. Jacob Kollamparambil, a Church historian says that when the ship carrying Ahatallah reached Goa, he was handed over to the inquisition, and he was kept in close custody in the Jesuit house there. He was sent to Portugal on the ship "Nosa Senhora da Graca" from Goa and reached Lisbon on 14 July 1653. The king of Portugal decided to send him to Rome. Joseph Thekkedath, another Church historian narrates that Vincent De Paul, who met Ahatallah at Paris, mentions him in the following words "There remains in this city a good old man of eighty years, a foreigner, who was lodging with the late monsignor Archbishop of Myra. They say he is the Patriarch of Antioch. Be that it may, he is alone and has no mark of prelacy". Thekkedath also adds that most probably, Ahatalla died in Paris.

== Oath ==
The treatment of Ahatalla, shocked the Thomas Christian community, and their wounded feelings effervesced into a mass upsurge that heralded the breaking off from the Padroado of the Portuguese Crown and the Jesuits.

"In case the patriarch cannot be produced, he having been killed by the Paulists [Jesuits], let any other person of the four religious orders come here by order of the supreme pontiff, a man who knows Syriac, and can teach us in our offices, except the Paulists, whom we do not at all desire, because they are enemies of us and of the church; with that exception let anybody come, and we are ready to obey without hesitation."

The Thomas Christians made one more attempt to reach some kind of compromise before proceeding to extreme measures. They wrote to Archbishop Garcia, requesting him to come and meet them but Garcia refused to accept the invitation. Seeing that the Archbishop thus turned a deaf ear to their insistent pleas, the Thomas Christians became extremely exasperated. On 3 January 1653, Archdeacon Thomas and representatives from the community assembled at Our Lady of Life Church, (Nossa Senhora da Vida) at Mattancherry to swear "never to submit to the Portuguese". Standing in front of a granite cross, the oath was read aloud with lighted candles, with the Archdeacon and the leading priests touching the Bible. The number of people who took part in the oath was so significant that all of them could not touch the cross at the same time. Therefore, they held on to ropes tied to the Cross in all directions. Because of the weight, it is said that the cross bent a little and so it is known as Oath of the bent cross (Coonen Kurisu Sathyam).

After this historic oath, out of a population of 200,000 St. Thomas Christians, only 400 remained loyal to Archbishop Garcia. The event broke the 54-year-old Padroado supremacy of the Portuguese Crown over the Thomas Christians which was imposed at the Synod of Diamper in 1599.

== Various interpretations of the events ==
The exact wordings of the Coonan Cross Oath is disputed. There are various versions on the wording of swearing.

== Aftermath ==
After the Coonan Cross Oath, three letters were circulated, purportedly sent by Ahathalla. One of these letters, read at a meeting in Edappally on 5 February 1653, granted the Archdeacon certain powers of the archbishop. Following this, a large group recognized Archdeacon Thomas as the leader of their church. Four senior priests—Anjilimoottil Itty Thommen Kathanar of Kallisseri, Parambil Palliveettil Chandy Kathanar of Kuravilangad, Kadavil Chandy Kathanar of Kaduthuruthi, and Vengur Giwargis Kathanar of Angamali—were appointed as his advisors.

At a subsequent meeting in Alangad on May 23, 1653, another letter, also attributed to Ahathalla, was read. This letter advised that in the absence of a bishop, twelve priests could lay hands on Archdeacon Thomas, which would suffice for episcopal consecration. The authenticity of these letters remains debated. Some believe the letters may have been forged by Anjilimoottil Itty Thommen Kathanar, a skilled Syriac writer. Others suggest that the letters may reflect an ancient Alexandrian Church tradition of elevating a presbyter to patriarch through the laying on of hands by fellow presbyters. Archdeacon Parambil Thomas was ultimately consecrated as Metropolitan by twelve priests, taking the title Thoma I.

Copies of three letters which are said to be written by Ahathalla to Saint Thomas Christians are preserved in the archives of the Propaganda Fide and were published in facsimile by Jacob Kollaparambil, a Church historian. In the first letter, Ahathalla informs Saint Thomas Christians of his coming to India and his detention by the Jesuits; in the second letter, he gives the order for Deacon George (George Parampil, one of his visitors at Mylapore) to be ordained Archdeacon and for the Saint Thomas Christians to establish a body consisting of 12 presbyters, one of whom should be elected as bishop; and in the third letter he legislates that Metropolitan Thoma I should be nominated as Patriarch of all India. István Perczel, observes that the Syriac of these letters is very strange. The first two letters are written in a similar style, with poor Syriac, but the third one is written in a different style. Some of the historians in Kerala think that second and third letters are forgeries and some consider all three are genuine. Perczel says that it is difficult to conclude the authenticity of these letters; the first and second letters are in poor Syriac, with possible Malayalam influences and moreover the first letter contains many absurd errors; these may be simply due to a copyist. On the other hand, the poor Syriac of the letters and the content style may indicate that they were forged in order to prepare and/or to justify the Coonan Cross revolt, by Saint Thomas Christian priests, having learned Syriac from Francisco Ros. He further highlights that the second letter, which served as basis for the enthronement of the Archdeacon Thomas, does not mention him by name, but on the contrary instructs the Saint Thomas Christians to appoint Deacon George Parambil as the Archdeacon and to establish a body consisting of 12 presbyters in order to elect the Metropolitan after the death of Francis Garcia. Perczel comments that this contradicts the hypothesis of a forgery by the authors of the Coonan Cross revolt. In fact, those who conducted the revolt and ordained Archdeacon Thomas to the bishopric had to distort the contents of this letter to justify what they did when they attributed to Archdeacon Thomas the rights given by the letter to George Parambil.

After the consecration of Thoma I, The information about this consecration was then communicated to all the churches. The vast majority of churches accepted Thoma I as their bishop. Thus, for the first time in history, Thomas Christians had a bishop from among their own people, and chosen by themselves. At this point of time, the Portuguese missionaries attempted reconciliation with Saint Thomas Christians but were not successful. Later, Pope Alexander VII sent a Carmelite priest Joseph Sebastiani as the head of a Carmelite delegation. The Carmelites claimed that the ordination of the archdeacon by the clergy was not in accordance with church law. He managed to persuade the Thomas Christians, including advisors of Thoma I metran Palliveettil Chandy and Kadavil Chandy Kathanar . As the validity of Thoma I's consecration was questioned, he began to lose followers. In the meantime, Sebastiani returned to Rome and was ordained as bishop by Pope on 15 December 1659. Joseph Sebastiani returned to Kerala in 1661 and within a short time period he restored most of the churches that had been with Thoma I to Rome. Thus, by 1663, 84 of the 116 churches in existence were in favor of Sebastiani, leaving only 32 churches in favor of Thoma I. However, in 1663, with the conquest of Cochin by the Dutch, the control of the Portuguese on the Malabar coast was lost. The Dutch declared that all the Portuguese missionaries had to leave Kerala. Before leaving Kerala, on 1 February 1663 Sebastiani consecrated Palliveettil Chandy as the Metran of the Thomas Christians who adhered to the Church of Rome.

Thoma I, meanwhile sent requests to various Oriental Churches to receive canonical consecration as bishop. In 1665, Gregorios Abdal Jaleel, a bishop sent by the Syrian Orthodox Patriarch of Antioch, arrived in India and the faction under the leadership of Thoma I welcomed him. The bishop was sent in correspondence to the letter sent by Thoma to the Oriental Orthodox Patriarchate of Antioch. Bishop Abdul Jaleel regularised the Episcopal succession of Thoma I. With this, the split among the Saint Thomas Christians became formal. The faction affiliated with the Catholic Church under Bishop Palliveettil Chandy, referred themselves as Pazhayakuttukar, or "Old Allegiance", and called the branch affiliated with Thoma I as Puthankuttukar, or "New Allegiance". These appellations have been somewhat controversial, though, as both parties considered themselves the true heirs to the Saint Thomas tradition, and saw the other party as schismatic.

This visit of Abdul Jaleel gradually introduced the West Syriac liturgy, customs and script to the Malabar Coast. The visits of prelates from the Syriac Orthodox Church of Antioch continued since then and this led to gradual replacement of the East Syriac Rite liturgy with the West Syriac Rite and the Puthenkoor faction affiliated to the Miaphysite Christology of the Oriental Orthodox Communion. The Pazhayakoor continued with the East Syriac traditions and stayed within the Catholic Church with Diophysite Faith. But following the death of Palliveettil Chandy, in 1687, the church was again fallen under the leadership of foreign missionaries for a long time and had to face challenges to their eastern, Syrian and indigenous heritage and rite.

The Pazhayakuttukar eventually gave rise to the modern Syro-Malabar Church and the Chaldean Syrian Church. The Puthankuttukar evolved into several other denominations known as the Malankara Church(including the Jacobite Syrian Christian Church, the Malankara Orthodox Syrian Church, the Mar Thoma Syrian Church, the St. Thomas Evangelical Church of India, the Syro-Malankara Catholic Church, and the Malabar Independent Syrian Church).

== See also ==
- Indo-Persian ecclesiastical relations
- Malankara Church
- Goa Inquisition
- Synod of Diamper

== Bibliography ==
- Baum, Wilhelm; Winkler, Dietmar W. (2003). The Church of the East: A Concise History. London & New York: Routledge-Curzon. ISBN 9781134430192.
- Brown, Leslie W. (1956). The Indian Christians of St Thomas: An Account of the Ancient Syrian Church of Malabar. Cambridge: Cambridge University Press.
- Chaput, Pascale (1999). "La Double identité des chrétiens keralais: confessions et castes chrétiennes au Kerala (Inde du Sud)" [The Double Identity of Kerala Christians: Confessions and Christian Castes (South India)]. Archives de sciences sociales des religions. 106: 5–23. doi:10.3406/assr.1999.1084.
- Fernando, Leonard; Gispert-Sauch, G. (2004). Christianity in India: Two Thousand Years of Faith. Viking. ISBN 9780670057696.
- Frykenberg, Robert Eric (2008). Christianity in India: From Beginnings to the Present. Oxford: Oxford University Press. ISBN 9780198263777.
- Gregorios, Paulos; Roberson, Ronald G. (2008). "Syrian Orthodox Churches in India". In Fahlbusch, Erwin; Lochman, Jan Milič; Mbiti, John; Pelikan, Jaroslav; Vischer, Lukas (eds.). The Encyclopedia of Christianity. Vol. 5. William B. Eerdmans Publishing. pp. 285–286. ISBN 978-0-8028-2417-2.
- Menachery, G., ed. (1973). The St. Thomas Christian Encyclopedia of India. Vol. II. Trichur: B.N.K. Press. ISBN 81-87132-06-X. Lib. Cong. Cat. Card. No. 73-905568; B.N.K. Press (has some 70 lengthy articles by different experts on the origins, development, history, culture... of these Christians, with some 300-odd photographs).
- Menachery, G., ed. (1982). The St. Thomas Christian Encyclopedia of India. Vol. 1. Trichur: B.N.K. Press.
- Menachery, G., ed. (1998). The Nazranies. The Indian Church History Classics. Vol. I. Ollur. ISBN 81-87133-05-8.
- Mingana, Alphonse (1926). "The Early Spread of Christianity in India" (PDF). Bulletin of the John Rylands Library. 10 (2): 435–514. doi:10.7227/BJRL.10.2.7.
- Mooken, Aprem (1977). The Chaldean Syrian Church in India. Trichur: Mar Narsai Press.
- Mooken, Aprem (1983). The Chaldean Syrian Church of the East. Delhi: National Council of Churches in India.
- Mundadan, Mathias (1967). The Arrival of the Portuguese in India and the Thomas Christians Under Mar Jacob, 1498–1552. Bangalore: Dharmaram College.
- Mundadan, Anthony Mathias; Thekkedath, Joseph (1982). History of Christianity in India. Vol. 2. Bangalore: Church History Association of India.
- Neill, Stephen (2004) [1984]. A History of Christianity in India: The Beginnings to AD 1707. Cambridge: Cambridge University Press. ISBN 9780521548854.
- Perczel, István (2011). Baby Varghese; Jacob Thekeparampil; Abraham Kalakudi (eds.). "Four apologetic church histories from India". The Harp. 24. Gorgias Press. ISBN 9781463233136.
- Podipara, Placid J. (1970). The Thomas Christians. London: Darton, Longman & Todd. ISBN 978-0-232-51140-6.
- Thekkedathu, Joseph (1972). The troubled Days of Francis Garcia S. J. Archbishop of Cranganore (1641–1659). Gregorian Biblical BookShop. ISBN 9788876521584.
- Tisserant, E. (1957). Eastern Christianity in India: A History of the Syro-Malabar Church from the Earliest Times to the Present Day. Translated and edited by E. R. Hambye. Westminster, MD: Newman Press.
- Vadakkekara, Benedict (2007). Origin of Christianity in India: A Historiographical Critique. Delhi: Media House. ISBN 9788174952585.
- Whitehouse, Thomas, ed. (1873). Lingerings of light in a dark land: Researches into the Syrian church of Malabar. William Brown and Co.
- Wilmshurst, David (2000). The Ecclesiastical Organisation of the Church of the East, 1318–1913. Louvain: Peeters Publishers. ISBN 9789042908765.
- Wilmshurst, David (2011). The martyred Church: A History of the Church of the East. London: East & West Publishing Limited. ISBN 9781907318047.
