= Royal patronage =

Royal patronage may refer to:

- Royal patronage, a.k.a. fount of honour, a representative of a sovereign or formerly sovereign entity who, by virtue of his or her official position, has the exclusive prerogative of conferring legitimate titles of nobility and orders of chivalry to other persons
- Royal patronage in arts, commerce, etc.
- Royal patronage, a.k.a. Patronato real, in Spain, the expression of royal patronage controlling major appointments of Church officials
- Royal patronage, a.k.a. Padroado, in Portugal and similar to Spain's above, an arrangement between the Holy See and the Kingdom of Portugal

== See also ==
- Category:Organizations with royal patronage
