= Synod of Diamper =

Colonial pseudo-diocesan synod in 1599

The Synod of Diamper (Malayalam: ഉദയംപേരൂർ സൂനഹദോസ്, romanized: Udayampērūṟ Sūnahadōs) was a Catholic diocesan synod held at Udayamperoor (Diamper in non-vernacular sources) in June 1599 that created rules and regulations for the ancient Saint Thomas Christians (also known as Mar Thoma Nasranis) of the Malabar Coast, a part of modern-day Kerala, India. The synod formally subjugated them to Latin Catholic authorities, downgrading the Archdiocese of Angamaly and All India to the Diocese of Angamalé, a suffragan see to the Archdiocese of Goa, which was administered by Portuguese Padroado missionaries. The synod also forced liturgical latinisation and the eschewal of local practices and beliefs, leading to a significant protest known as the Coonan Cross Oath and a subsequent schism in the mid-17th century.

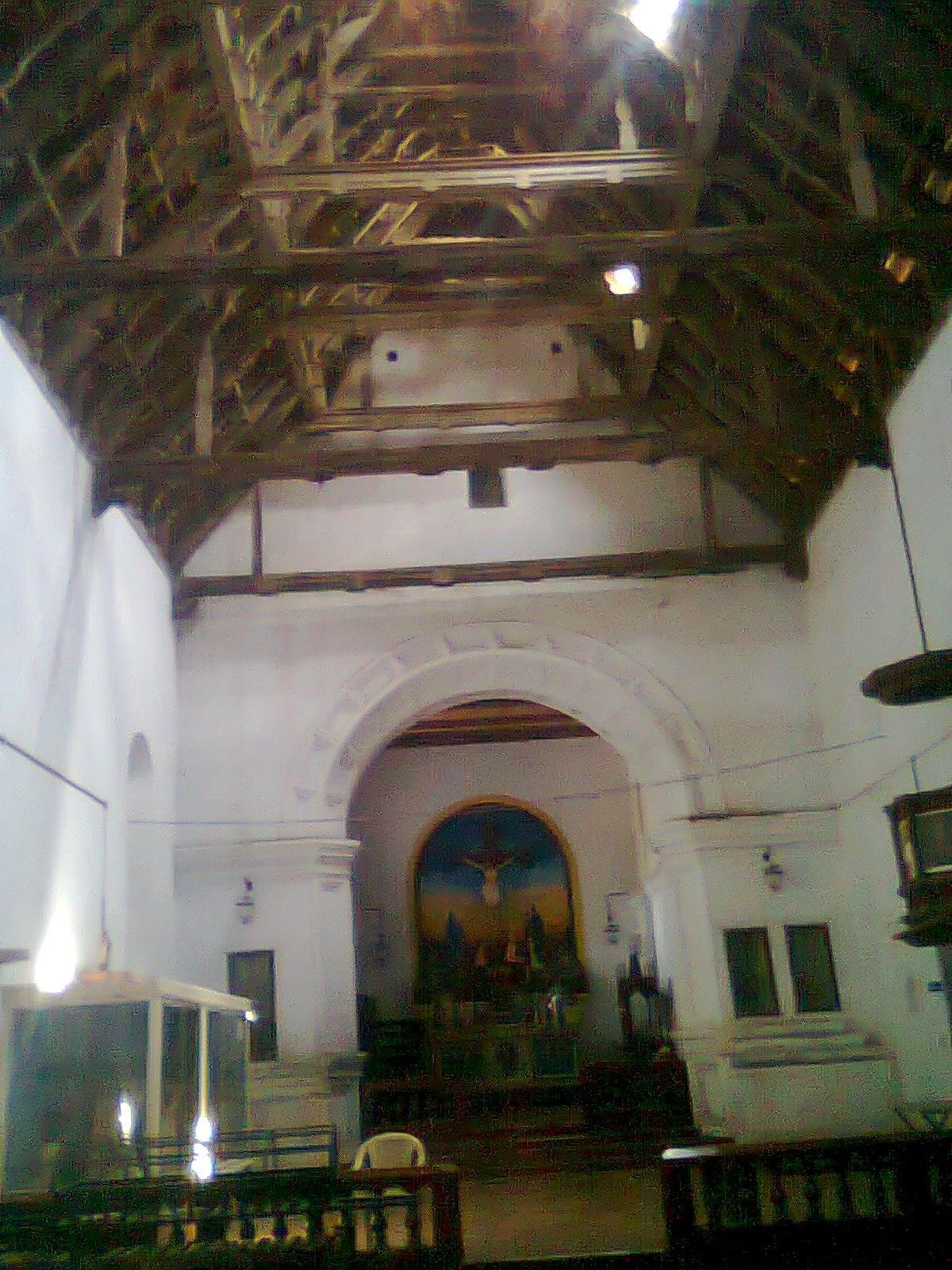
Interior of the Udayamperūr Syro-Malabar Church which had hosted the Synod of Diamper

== Background ==
=== Early history of Saint Thomas Christians ===
The Saint Thomas Christians, who trace their origins to the evangelistic activity of Thomas the Apostle in the 1st century, were in communion with the Church of the East of Persia and the Patriarch of the Seleucia-Ctesiphon, and relied on their bishops. Thus, while the bishops from the Middle East were the spiritual heads of the Church, the general administration of the Church of Kerala was governed by an indigenous priest known as Arkkadiyakkon or Archdeacon. He was the community leader of Saint Thomas Christians. Even in times when there were multiple foreign bishops, there was only one archdeacon for entire Saint Thomas Community.

=== Portuguese missionaries and Saint Thomas Christians ===
The Portuguese fleet led by Pedro Alvarez Cabral, arrived in Malabar in 1500 with a missionary team of 19 members. More than half of them were Franciscans. Later, most of the groups that came from Portugal included missionaries. Initially, the Portuguese missionaries were on good terms with the Saint Thomas Christians, but between 1520 and 1530, relations between them began to fall apart. This is because the Portuguese began to impose their church traditions on the Malabar Christians.

The Church of the East collapsed by 1552, through the schism of 1552, and a faction (the modern day Chaldean Catholic Church) under the leadership of Yohannan Sulaqa joined in communion with the Church of Rome. It is difficult to say exactly how this split affected the Church of Saint Thomas Christians in Malabar. Following the split, both factions – the Nestorian and Chaldean Catholic – began sending their bishops to Kerala. Abraham, later known as Abraham of Angamaly was one of the last bishops from the Church of the East. Mar Abraham first arrived in India before 1556 as a Nestorian bishop from the traditional Nestorian Patriarchate. The Portuguese managed to arrest him and sent him off to Lisbon, but on the way he escaped at Mozambique and left to Mesopotamia and presented himself to Abdiso, the Chaldean patriarch who had declared allegiance to the Pope of Rome. The patriarch re-consecrated the Abraham, sent him with letters to Pope Pius IV. Abraham received his episcopal ordination again, third time, in Rome in 1565 and returned in India in 1568. In spite of the express approbation by Pope, he was not welcomed by the Portuguese authorities in Goa and was arrested second time. However, Abraham escaped in 1570 and reached Malabar, there he directed his faithful in defiance of the Portuguese until his death in 1597.

=== Preparations for the Synod ===
After the death of Abraham, Aleixo de Menezes the Archbishop of Goa began efforts to bring Archdiocese of Angamaly under Goa. Menezes nominated Francis Ros as Administrator of Angamaly. But by this time the Archdeacon, George (of the Cross), according to the custom and by appointment of Abraham, took up the administration of the Archdiocese of Angamaly. Therefore, Menezes had to withdraw the administrator. But Menesis decided that Saint Thomas Christians should be unconditionally placed under the spiritual authority of the Pope. For this, he sought the help of viceroy of Goa, the Portuguese Captain of Kochi and the King of Kochi. Also, the Portuguese were very careful at the ports to prevent any Eastern Bishops from entering Kerala.

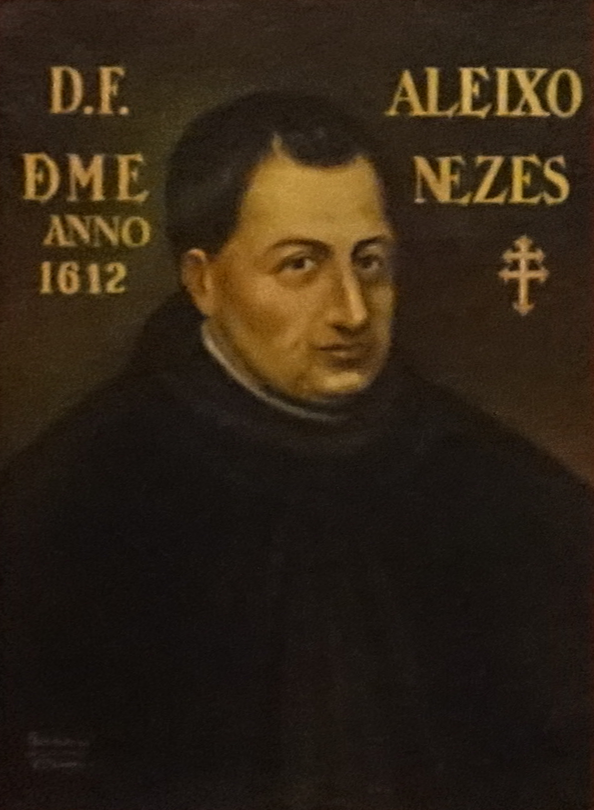
Archbishop Alexis de Menezes of Goa, who was the chief architect and driving force behind the Synod of Udayamperoor

Archbishop Menezes visited Malabar in February 1599. Menezes threatened to depose Archdeacon George and appoint in his place Thomas Kurian, another nephew of George whose claims had been ignored in 1593. In order to prevent a division, George gave in to the demands of Menezes. After carrying out a visitation in various parishes of Saint Thomas Christians, gaining the support of the local rulers and some of the local clergy, also by ordaining a large number of new priests, and forcing Archdeacon, to submit to him, Menezes called for a synod to be convened in June 1599. Instead of Angamaly, the headquarters of the diocese, a small place called Diamper (Udayamperur) near Kochi, the Portuguese stronghold, was chosen as the venue for the Synod.

== The Synod ==
The synod solemnly began on the third Sunday after Pentecost, 20 June 1599, in the church of Diamper (Udayamperoor) and continued until 26 June 1599. The synod, attended by 153 local priests and 660 lay representatives. Menezes presided over the synod. The Patriarch of Babylon, was condemned as a heretic and schismatic, and they were made to swear that they would not accept any bishop except the one nominated by Rome. The controversial Synod of Diamper canonized the Latinization of the Church of Saint Thomas Christians. Academicians have raised doubts on the validity of the synod and whether it violated canon law on the facts that the synod was convened on threat of excommunication by an archbishop of nearby archdiocese who was permitted by pope to appoint an apostolic administrator with limited powers, not the ordinary diocesan archbishop.

=== Decrees of the Synod ===
The synod issued 200 decrees distributed in nine actions (sessions). It has been suggest that the differences between the decrees of the synod, are due to translation. It has been suggested that these decrees were first formulated in the Portuguese language by Don Menezes and then translated to Malayalam. It has been suggested that the participants signed the Malayalam document, which lacks 35 of the Canons given in the Portuguese text.

=== Changes in liturgy ===
The text on which the synod worked was a composite East Syriac text of Anaphora of Addai and Mari. The Anaphorae of Nestorius, Theodore, and Diodore (the latter now lost) were abolished and their manuscripts were asked to brought to Menesis to be destroyed. The synod declared certain passages of the Holy Qurbana of Addai and Mari as 'impious, sacrilegious and resulting from Nestorian heresy'. The changes made by the synod consist of six in litanies, seven in hymns or anthems, four in formulae of the deacon, one in the response of the people, one in the text of the gospel lesson, and one affecting the whole creed. In the prayer of the priest, there are five changes in the pre-anaphora part of the Qurbana of Addai and Mari. There are four changes within the anaphora and eleven in the four variable hutame (Sealing prayers).

=== Decisions impacted social life ===
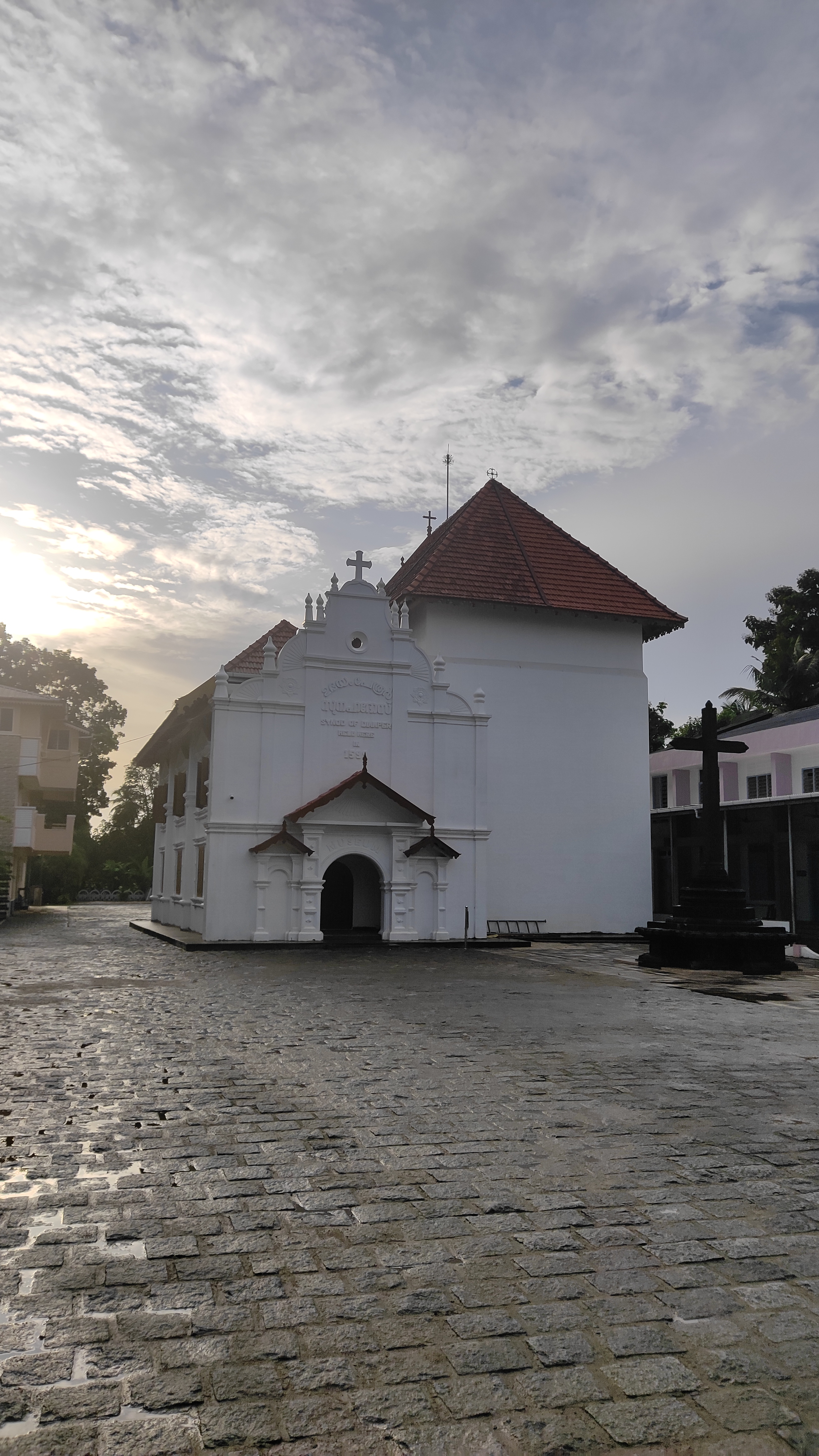
Udayamperūr Syro-Malabar Church

The Synod of Diamper condemned a multitude of Hindus beliefs, especially those related to transmigration, fate, and astrology. Hindu ceremonies and customs related to matrimony, death, birth, and purification on touching lower castes, which were prevalent among the Christians of Saint Thomas, were abandoned altogether. They were even banned from frequenting to Hindu festivities including Onam. The synod also condemned the belief that every man might be saved by his laws, all of which are good and lead to heaven, irrespective of his religion. The synod banned Christian teachers from installing or using any Hindu idols in their schools. Polygamy and concubinage were forbidden, and clergymen were banned from marital relations, military services to Hindu princes, and other secular indulgences. Previously, Hindu musicians had been used to conduct programs in Christian churches, but the synod banned the practice outright.

=== Prohibition of books ===
The synod prohibited the use of many books deemed heretical. These books are listed below.

- The Infancy of our Saviour (The History of our Lady) (language: Syriac)
- Book of John Barialdan (language: Syriac)
- The Procession of the Holy Spirit (language: Persian)
- Margarita Fidei (The Jewel)
- Fathers (language: Unknown)
- Life of Abed Isho (language: Arabic)
- Book of Synods (language: Syriac)
- Book of 'Timothy the Patriarch' (language: Persian)
- Domingo or Letter of the Lord's-day (language: Malayalam)
- Maclamatas (language: Syriac)
- Uguarda or Rose (language: Greek)
- Camiz (language: Syriac)
- Menra (language: Hebrew)
- Book of Orders (language: Tamil)
- Book of Homilies (language: Arabic)
- An Exposition of the Gospels (language: Syriac)
- Book of Hormisda Raban (language: Greek)
- Book of Lots (language: Aramaic).
- A book of unknown title which is a Nestorian version of Flos Sanctorum (language: Syriac)
- Parisman or Persian Medicine (language: Persian)

=== Destruction of books ===
The decree XVI ordered that all the Syriac manuscripts should be handed over to the Archbishop or his deputy on a visit to the Churches. Due to the lack of printed books, the Qurbana manuscripts were excluded from this.

Numerous Syriac manuscripts condemned for destruction by the Portuguese authorities survived through concealment, preservation, and continued copying by local Christian communities. Surviving copies of important East Syriac works, including the Nomocanon of Abdisho of Nisibis, the Gospel Commentary of Ishodad of Merv, and Abdisho’s Paradise of Eden, are identified as evidence of this continuity Dr. Istvan Perczel, a Hungarian scholar researching Syrian Christians in India, found that certain texts survived the destruction of Syriac religious writings by the Portuguese missionaries.

== Reception of the synod ==
The Church authorities noted the result of the synod was not as helpful as they expected. As the Catholic Encyclopedia (1913) says, "The only case in which an ancient Eastern rite has been wilfully romanized is that of the Uniat Malabar Christians, where it was not Roman authority but the misguided zeal of Alexius de Menezes, Archbishop of Goa, and his Portuguese advisers at the Synod of Diamper (1599) which spoiled the old Malabar Rite."

After the Synod of Diamper, on 25 November 1599, a letter was sent to Pope by the Archdeacon, giving information about the synod and its work. The letter praises the work of Menezes and requests the appointment of Menezes or Francis Ros as their bishop. The letter does not fully represent the genuine sentiments of Archdeacon, as by that time he was completely at the mercy of the Portuguese and the only thing left for him to do was to follow their directives.

In this way, the Synod of Diamper achieved one of the aims of the Portuguese policy in Kerala, to separate the Syrian Christians of Malabar from the Chaldean Patriarch and to extend the influence of Portuguese Padroado in India. As a result, the King of Portugal got the right of nomination to the ancient See of Saint Thomas in Malabar. The Archbishopric of Angamale was degraded to a Portuguese Padroado diocese under Goa on 4 August 1600, AD.

== Aftermath ==
After the Synod of Diamper, Menezes stayed in Kerala until November 1599, visited the churches, examined the traditional books preserved there and those deemed heretical were burned.

=== Change in Administration ===
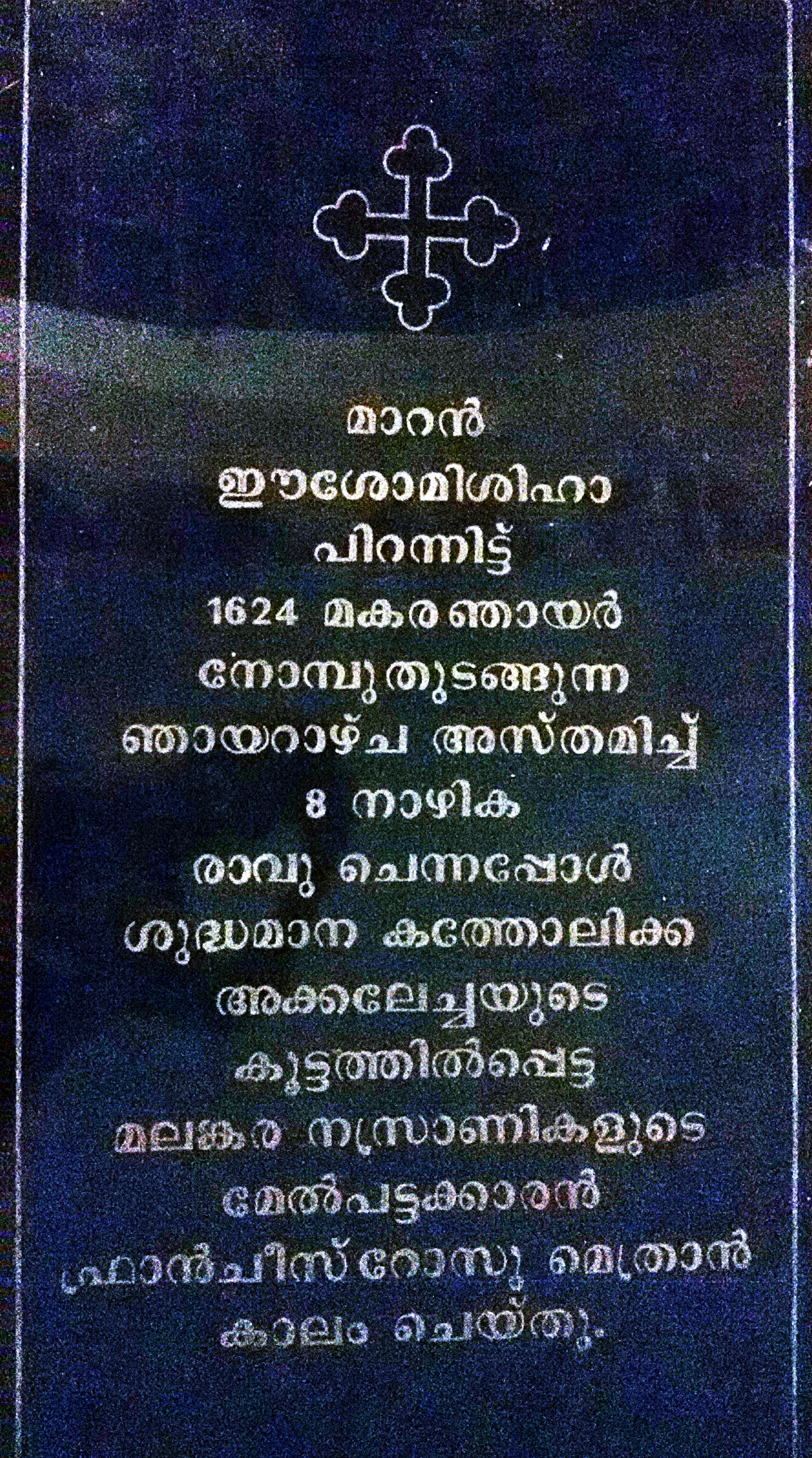
Tomb of Francis Roz, first Jesuit Metropolitan of Kodungalloor Archeparchy, inside Kottakkavu Mar Thoma Syro-Malabar Pilgrim Church, North Paravur.

The Archbishopric of Angamaly was downgraded to a bishopric under Goa in 1600. Portuguese Padroado rule was thus imposed and the bishops for Saint Thomas Christians were appointed by Portuguese Padroado. Under Portuguese Padroado, Latin Bishops were appointed to govern the Saint Thomas Christians. Francis Ros was nominated as successor to Abraham on 5 November 1599. Bishop Ros, centralized in himself all the authority reducing almost to nothing the powers of Archdeacon. Roz died on 16 February 1624 and was succeeded by Bishop Stephen Britto. George of the Cross died c. 1634 and was succeeded by Archdeacon Thomas. Britto died in 1641 and Bishop Garcia Francis succeeded him. A regular fight ensued between the Francis and Thomas.

=== Great Oath of Bent Cross (Coonan Cross Oath) ===
The oppressive rule of the Portuguese Padroado provoked a violent reaction by the Saint Thomas Christian community. The first solemn protest occurred in 1653. Under the leadership of Archdeacon Thoma, Nasranis gathered at Mattancherry church on Friday, 24 January 1653 (M.E. 828 Makaram 3), and made an oath that is known as the Great Oath of Bent Cross. Those who were not able to touch the cross-tied ropes on the cross held the rope in their hands and made the oath. Because of the weight, it is said that the cross bent a little and so it is known as Oath of the bent cross (Coonen Kurisu Sathyam). The exact wording of the oath is a matter of dispute. There are various versions about the wording of oath, one version being that the oath was directed against the Portuguese, another that it was directed against Jesuits, yet another version that it was directed against the authority of Church of Rome.

=== Schism in Saint Thomas Christian Community ===
Four months after the Coonan Cross Oath, twelve priests of the church laid their hands on Archdeacon Thomas and ordained him as Thoma I. The Portuguese missionaries attempted to reconcile with Saint Thomas Christians but were not successful.

Francis Ros realised that there was resistance on the part of the Christians of St. Thomas, regarding the suppression of their ancient Metropolitan title. He decided to convoke a new Synod to substitute the Synod of Diampere. The Second Synod of Angamaly met in 1603 and Angamaly became a separate Archdiocese again in 1608.

Later, Pope Alexander VII sent a Carmelite delegation under Joseph Sebastiani who succeeded in convincing the majority of Saint Thomas Christians, including Palliveettil Chandy Kathanar and Kadavil Chandy Kathanar that the consecration of the archdeacon as metropolitan was not legitimate.As the validity of Thoma I's consecration was questioned, he began to lose followers. In the meantime, Sebastiani returned to Rome and was ordained as bishop by Pope on 15 December 1659. Joseph Sebastiani returned to Kerala in 1661 and within a short time period he restored most of the churches that had been with Thoma I to Rome. Thus, by 1663, 84 of the 116 churches in existence were in favor of Sebastiani, leaving only 32 churches in favor of Thoma I. However, in 1663, with the conquest of Cochin by the Dutch, the control of the Portuguese on the Malabar coast was lost. The Dutch declared that all other the Europeans had to leave Malabar. Before leaving Kerala, on 1 February 1663 Sebastiani consecrated Palliveettil Chandy as the Metran of the Thomas Christians who adhered to the Church of Rome.

Thoma I, meanwhile sent requests to various Oriental Churches to receive canonical consecration as bishop. In 1665, Gregorios Abdal Jaleel, a bishop from Syriac Orthodox Church, arrived in India and the faction under the leadership of Thoma I welcomed him. The bishop was sent in correspondence to the letter sent by Thoma to the Syriac Orthodox Patriarchate of Antioch. Bishop Abdul Jaleel regularized the Episcopal succession of Thoma I. Thereafter the faction affiliated with the Catholic Church under Palliveettil Chandy was referred themselves as the Paḻayakūṟ or Pazhayakūttukar ("Old Party"), while the branch affiliated with Thoma I was called the Puthankūttukar ("Puthenkoor faction" or "New Party"). These appellations have been somewhat controversial, as both groups considered themselves the true heirs to the Saint Thomas tradition and saw each other as heretical.

This visit of Gregorios Abdal Jaleel gradually introduced the West Syriac liturgy, customs and script in the Puthenkoor faction. The visits of prelates from the Syriac Orthodox Church of Antioch continued since then and this led to gradual replacement of the East Syriac Rite liturgy with the West Syriac Rite and the faction affiliated to the Miaphysite Christology of the Oriental Orthodox Communion. The Pazhayakoor faction continued with the East Syriac traditions and Diophysite faith and stayed within the Catholic Church. By this process, Saint Thomas Christians were divided into East Syriac and West Syriac branches.

Successive divisions have taken place and as a result, Saint Thomas Christians currently belong to several different churches. The Pazhayakoor faction divided into Syro-Malabar Church and Chaldean Syrian Church, while the Puthenkoor faction divided into the Syriac Orthodox Church in India (Jacobite Syrian Christian Church), Indian Orthodox Church, Saint Thomas Anglicans of the Church of South India, Mar Thoma Syrian Church, St. Thomas Evangelical Church of India, Syro-Malankara Catholic Church and Malabar Independent Syrian Church.

== Books (Studies on Synod of Diamper) ==
- Paul Pallath, "The Synod of Diamper: valid or invalid?"
- George Nedungatt S.J., "The Synod of Diamper Revisited", Pontifical Instituto Orientale, Rome, 2001.
- Joseph Kuzhinjalil, "The disciplinary Legislation of Synod of Diamper" (1975)
- Jonas Thaliath, "The Synod of Diamper" (1958)
- Connolly, "The Work of Meneses"
- Codrington, "The Chaldean Liturgy"
- Codrington, "The Malabar Liturgy and Synod of Diamper"
- Neill, Stephen – (1977) A history of Christian missions Neill, Stephen – The story of the Christian church in India and Pakistan
- Eric Frykenberg, Robert – Christianity in India
- Hough, James – 1845 – The history of Christianity in India: Volume 4
- Sir William Kaye, John – Christianity in India
- Bruce Firth, Cyril – An introduction to Indian church history
- Hunter, W.W. – (1886) The Indian Empire; Its People History and Products pp 240
- Logan, William – (1887) Malabar Manual pp 119
- Nangam Aiya, V. – (1906) The Travancore State Manual Volume 2 pp 243
- Barton, John M. – (1872) The Syrian Christians: Narrative of a Tour in the Travancore Mission of the Church Missionary Society Mission Life, Vol. III * * Geddes, Michael – (1694) A short History of the Church of Malabar
- Henry, J. & Parker, J – The Christians of St. Thomas and their liturgies
- Milne Rae, George – Syrian Church in India Whitehouse, Thomas – (1873) Lingerings of light in a dark land: researches into the Syrian church of Malabar * * Brown, Leslie- The Indian Christians of St Thomas
- David Macbride, John – (1856) – The Syrian church in India
