= Kathanar =

Ancient Indian term for Christian priests

Kathanar (Malayalam: കത്തനാർ) is an ancient Nasrani Mappila term in Malayalam that means priest. The term is still in colloquial usage, although not in regular formal use. It was anglicized in archaic English texts as Cattanar or Kattanar, especially during 19th century CE or earlier.

Due to the widespread usage of English terminology such as Father, Reverend, Vicar or the Malayalam word Achen (Malayalam: അച്ചന്‍) or the Syriac word Kasseessa (Malayalam: കശ്ശീശ്ശ), it mostly fell out of usage in contemporary formal contexts, but recently found a revival among Nasrani Mappilas.

== Notable Kathanars ==
- Kadavil Chandy Kathanar
- Paremmakkal Thoma Kathanar
- Kadamattathu Kathanar
- Nidhiry Mani Kathanar
- Payyappilly Varghese Kathanar
- Rev. George Mathan a.k.a. Geevarghese Kathanar
- Anchal Achan a.k.a. Younan Kathanar
- Iype Thoma Kathanar aka Kovoor Achen
- Dethose Kathanar, who later became Titus I Mar Thoma Metropolitan
- Anjilimoottil Itty Thommen Kathanar
- Malpan Malpane Koonammakkal Thoma Kathanar

== See also ==
- Ecclesiastical Address
- Kalliyankattu neeli
