= Anchal Achan =

Saint of Anchal

Anchal Achan (Rev: Younan Kathanar) (Mor Yaunan Kasheesho) is a saint of Anchal. He lived in the first half of 19th century. The saint was born in Marunthalizhikathu family in Anchal. The exact date of his birth is unknown. According to historic assumptions he was born sometime around AD 1770-80.

== Ordination ==
He started his life as a priest in the Kottarakkara church. He used to go 16 km to Kottarakkara by walking from Anchal. Later he moved to the church compound.

== Lifestyle ==
He used to do all of his work on his own. One day after returning from his morning bath, he saw his elder brother's wife sweeping his room. Standing outside, (without entering the room), he asked for his Bible and other books and he left for Kottarakkara. He stayed the whole of his remaining life at Kottarakkara church. Kottarakkara church made all arrangements for his stay in the premises of the church itself.

== Death ==
Before his death he asked his church people at Kottarakkara church to open his "kabar" on 41st day of his death and will find his body intact position. He died on one "Karkidakam 22". After his death on 41st day the people of Kottarakara church opened the kabar and found the body intact position, except the top of the nose and top of two fingers decayed, the reason for that says-one day he plucked a rose flower before Kurbana) However, later the Orthodox Church lost the Kottarakara Church to Marthoma Church on litigation. Now it is a Marthomite church. The Kabar of Anchal achan is situated in the altar of Kottarakkara Marthomite church.

== Anchal Orthodox Valliya Pally ==
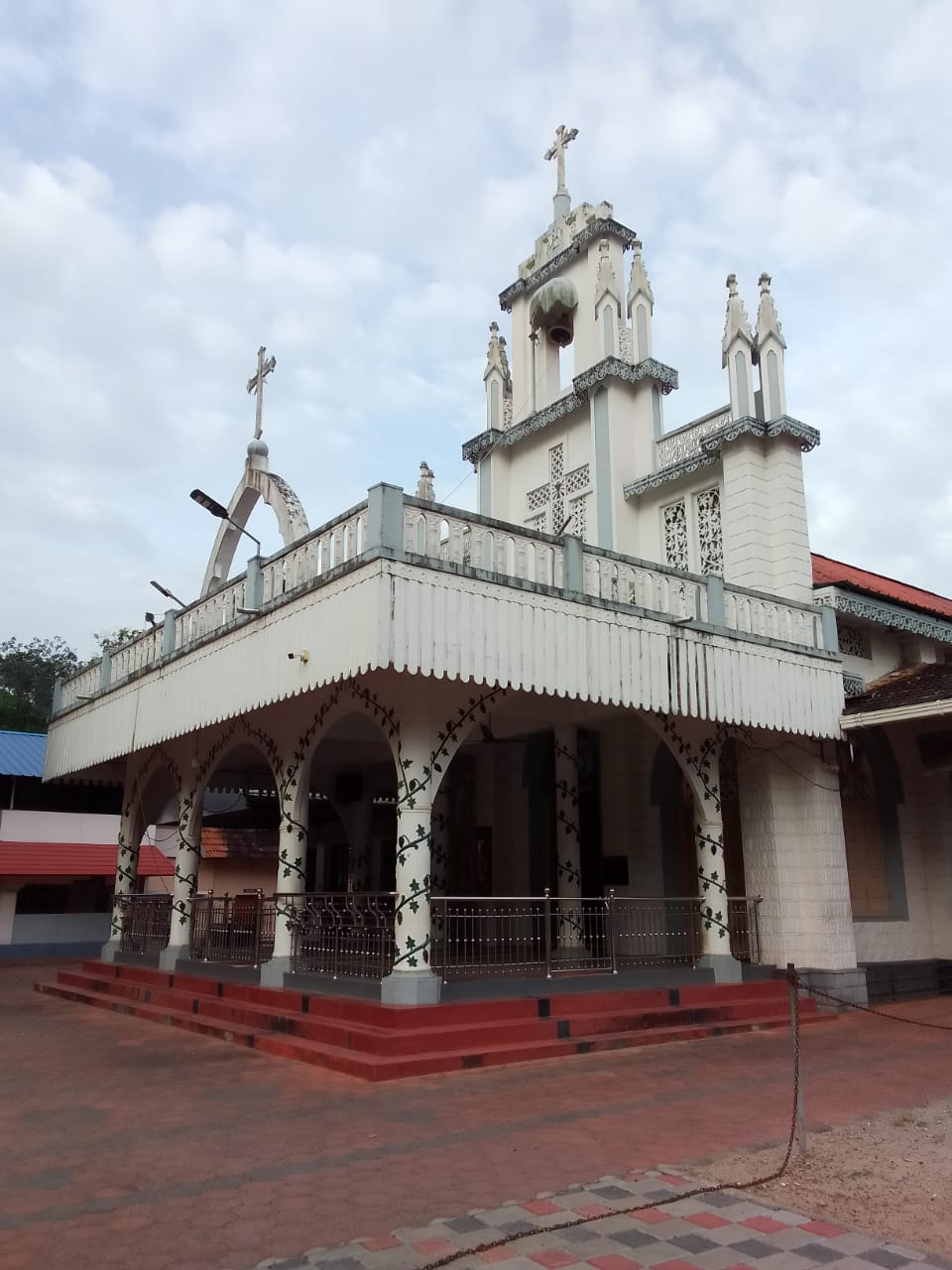
St. George Orthodox Syrian Church(Valiya Pally), Anchal

Anchal St. George Orthodox Valiya Pally is one of the prominent churches in south Kerala. It gets its fame from the spiritual presence of St. George and St.Anchal Achan. Recognizing the importance of this spiritual place, the Catholicos of East Mor Baselios Thoma Didymos I declared the parish as Valiya Pally (Great Parish) and a Georgian Pilgrim Centre.

== See also ==
- Malankara Orthodox Syrian Church
- Jacobite Syrian Orthodox Church

== Sources ==
- Annammayum Pasterum by Father K. Gheevarghese, Manoor, Anchal
- The Mirror of Apostolic Faith by Shri E.S. John
