= Padroado-Propaganda Schism =

Catholic ecclesiastical conflict

The Padroado-Propaganda Schism was an ecclesiastical conflict that pitted Catholics against each other, sometimes leading to physical violence, insults and mutual excommunications, but most usually subsisting in a long, sullen mutual co-existence in hostility.

The Padroado originated when the Portuguese kings took the initiative to explore the coasts of Africa. They pushed to the east, seeking to find new areas for trade and to win new converts to the Catholic faith. Moved by their zeal, successive popes granted wide-ranging favors and authorities to the kings, who claimed they were given irrevocable powers to establish and patronize churches and bishoprics in lands opened to Portuguese trade in South Asia.

The Padroado or Padroado Real has its foundation in canon law, which recognized the right of laymen to establish and patronize churches and missions, as a means to supplement the efforts of the papacy, the Church and the religious orders. Such laypersons were recognized as Patrons and possessed certain rights and privileges over the churches and missions they established, financed and patronized.

As the Portuguese began to extend their explorations to India, they were followed by missionaries from various religious orders, who began to build churches along the coastal districts wherever the Portuguese settled. In 1534 an episcopal see was created at Goa, suffragan to Funchal in the Madeiras. Its jurisdiction extended potentially over all past and future conquests from the Cape of Good Hope to China and Japan. In 1557 it was made an independent archbishopric, with suffragan sees at Cochin and Malacca. In 1612 the prelacy of Mozambique was added, and in 1690 two other sees at Peking and Nanking in China. By the bulls establishing these sees the right of nomination was conferred in perpetuity on the King of Portugal, under the titles of foundation and endowment.

The limits between the various sees of were defined by a papal bull in 1616. The suffragan sees comprised roughly the south of the peninsula and the east coast, as far as Burma inclusive, the rest of India remaining potentially under the jurisdiction of the archdiocese and this potential jurisdiction was actually exercised even outside Portuguese dominions wherever the faith was extended by Portuguese missionaries.

As the Portuguese power waned during the 17th and 18th centuries, in the face of the Dutch wars against Spain and Portugal, and the growth of the English empire, was followed by a decline in the supply of missionaries. The popes found that it was sometimes with difficulty that the established missions could be maintained, let alone extended. Seeking to provide for them and their spiritual needs, the Holy See began, through the Congregation for the Propagation of the Faith, to send out missionaries independent of Portugal, and appointed vicars apostolic over several districts. The king resented the Propaganda clerics as intruders. In certain places where these vicars apostolic came into contact with the Portuguese clergy, there arose a conflict of jurisdiction. This was particularly the case in Bombay, which had been ceded to the British in 1661. Here the Portuguese clergy were at first allowed to remain in charge of the churches, but in 1720, on the ground that they caused disaffection among the people against the British power, they were expelled. They were replaced by Carmelite missionaries under a vicar apostolic. This was intended to be a temporary arrangement until such time as the British government should allow the Portuguese clergy to return. Efforts were made from time to time on the part of the Goan party to recover their place, and this ultimately, through a division of the churches in 1794, gave rise to the existence of two rival jurisdictions in Bombay—Padroado and Propaganda.

The Holy See had for a long time been dissatisfied with the general situation, and especially with the opposition shown to the vicars apostolic by the Goan prelates and clergy. After the revolution of 1834 in Portugal, the expulsion or abolition of the religious orders, and the severing of diplomatic relations with the Vatican came the famous brief Multa praeclare on 24 April 1838 reducing the jurisdiction of the Archdiocese of Goa to actual Portuguese territory. This brief was, however, rejected by the Goan party as spurious since they contended that even the Holy See could not rightly legislate in this manner without the consent of the king of Portugal, as was declared in the original bulls of foundation. A final settlement was not arrived at until 1886, when a concordat was drawn up, and a bull (Humanae Salutatis Auctor, 1 September 1886) issued, by which the respective jurisdictions were clarified and agreed to. At the same time the Indian hierarchy was established, and the whole of the country divided into provinces, dioceses, and prefectures apostolic.
