= Ahatallah =

Syriac Orthodox bishop

Mor Cyril Ahatallah Ibn-Issa
- Other posts: Metropolitan of Damascus, Homs, Nicomedia

Orders
- Consecration: Moran Mor Ignatius Hidayat Aloho

Personal details
- Born: 1590 (approx) Aleppo
- Died: 26 March 1654

Ahatallah (1590 – c. 1655) was a Syrian Orthodox Church metropolitan chiefly known for his trip to India in 1652. His mysterious appearance in, and disappearance from Portuguese India caused a great uproar there, and resulted directly in a revolt by the Saint Thomas Christians against Portuguese rule and the establishment of an independent Malankara Church.

== Biography ==
Ahatallah's biography is obscure. Many earlier scholars, including the Lebanese Orientalist Joseph Simon Assemani and Edward René Hambye, believed he was a Jacobite, a member of the Syriac Orthodox Church. However, later research by Joseph Thekedathu, relying on additional documents found in the archives in the Vatican and Goa, has established further details of his life. He was born in Aleppo, Syria, in 1590, and did enter the Syriac Orthodox Church, eventually being consecrated Bishop of Damascus. While bishop he converted to the Catholic Church, and in 1632 he traveled to Rome. He stayed there for over a year, and became fluent in Italian. Eventually he requested to return to Syria, where he vowed he would bring the Syriac Orthodox Patriarch of Antioch, Ignatius Hidayat Aloho, into communion with Rome. What happened thereafter is unclear.

Ahatallah was certainly unsuccessful in converting Hidayat Aloho before the patriarch died in 1639. Apparently, he was later elected Patriarch of Antioch under the name Ignatius by a group of Syrian Orthodox bishops. After that point, Ahatallah apparently began claiming he was Hidayat Aloho's rightful successor, and began styling himself "Ignatius", the name traditionally borne by Syriac Orthodox Patriarchs. Since Turkish opposition made it impossible for him to take up this post, he had been despatched to Persia to care for the churches there. By 1646 he was in Cairo, where he seems to have been known at the court of the Coptic Pope of Alexandria. That year he sent a correspondence to the Sacred Congregation for the Propagation of the Faith (Propaganda Fide) in Rome, but received no response for several years. While Ahatallah was in Cairo, the Pope of Alexandria, Mark VI, received a letter from Thomas, Archdeacon of the Saint Thomas Christian community in India. Thomas was at loggerheads with the Portuguese administration in India, and had begun appealing to various foreign patriarchs – the Patriarch of the Church of the East in Persia, the Syriac Orthodox Patriarch in Syria, and Pope Mark in Egypt – for assistance. Since there was no one else to send, Mark suggested to Ahatallah to take up this important work. Having nothing else to do, Ahatallah accepted this commission.

Ahatallah arrived in India in 1652, coming first to Surat. There he made the acquaintance of the Capuchin monks, but afraid of being taken by the authorities and subjected to the Inquisition, he quietly boarded a Dutch vessel bound for Mylapore, which he reached most likely in August 1652. There, he began claiming that the Pope had commissioned him as "Patriarch of the Whole of India and of China", and that his patriarchal name was Ignatius. The Portuguese decided he was an impostor, and possibly a heretic, and summarily arrested him and put him in the custody of the Jesuits. However, the Jesuits extended considerable freedom to him, and allowed him to meet with Zachariah Cherrian Unni and two other members of the Saint Thomas Christian clergy. Ahatallah greatly impressed the native clergymen, who returned to their home region of Kerala with a letter from their community's new "Patriarch".

Historian Stephen Neill notes the difficulty in determining what of Ahatallah's story can be accepted as true. There is no evidence that the Roman pope had authorized him to go to India, let alone claim to be its Patriarch. Similarly, the Coptic pope could not have given him the commission, as he could assert no authority in India, which was under the jurisdiction of other patriarchs – historically the Patriarch of the Church of the East and now the Roman pope. Neill notes that however exaggerated these claims were, there is little reason to doubt that Ahatallah was at least a bishop, who had converted from the Syriac Orthodox Church to Catholicism. But another historian Robert Erick Frykenberg states that he was a member of Syriac Orthodox Church when he came to India.

== Disappearance and aftermath ==
Ahatallah's appearance had joyed the Saint Thomas Christians, who had hoped for a new ecclesiastical leader to free them from the power of the Portuguese Padroado, which since the Synod of Diamper in 1599 had formally controlled church life in India. Soon, however, the Jesuit Manoel de Leira secretly alerted the Portuguese authorities about Ahatallah's activities, and they put him on a ship headed for Cochin and Goa. Hearing of this, Archdeacon Thomas led his militia to Cochin and demanded to meet with Ahatallah and examine his credentials. The Portuguese officials refused. They noted that no Patriarch could be legally assigned to India without the dispensation of the Portuguese, and informed Thomas that Ahatallah had already been sent to Goa.

Ahatallah was never heard from again in India, and the Saint Thomas Christians soon suspected that the Portuguese had murdered him. Rumours spread that the Portuguese had drowned him in Cochin harbour before the ships even left for Goa, or even that they had tried him for heresy and burned him at the stake. Even the earlier historians have mentioned that Ahatallah was drowned by the Portuguese. Some modern writers state that Ahatallah was not killed in 1653 but was sent as a prisoner to Lisbon, where he reportedly died a natural death in the prison. Based on the research of Joseph Thekedathu, it has been claimed that Ahatallah did in fact reach Goa, and was then sent on to Lisbon with the ultimate goal of having his case decided in Rome, but died in Paris in 1654 while on the way.

After realizing that the Portuguese had taken Ahatallah, representatives of the Saint Thomas Christians came together at the Church of Our Lady in Mattancherry and swore the Coonan Cross Oath, in which they vowed they would never again submit to the Portuguese. By this action, an independent Thomas Christian church, known as the Malankara Church, was formed, and its leaders soon decided that Archdeacon Thomas should be elevated to the episcopal position they had earlier hoped Ahatallah would fill.

Supporting that move, Anjilimoothil Ittithommen, one of the senior priests, produced two letters supposedly from Ahatallah that authorized the Archdeacon's consecration as bishop and detailed a ceremony facilitating it. According to these letters, if no bishop could be found to perform the consecration, twelve priests could lay their hands on the candidate instead. The authenticity of these letters is not clear. According to Stephen Neill, these letters were almost certainly not authentic, and were probably forged by Ittithommen himself. Some were skeptical of this atypical ceremony, but Ahatallah's reputation and the enthusiastic mood ensured that it went ahead as planned. Thomas was consecrated by twelve priests, who laid one of the letters attributed to Ahatallah on his head, and afterward he acted fully as the metropolitan of Malankara.
