= István Perczel =

Hungarian scholar (born 1957)

István Perczel (Hungarian: [ˈiʃtvaːn ˈpɛrt͡sɛl]; born 1957) is a Hungarian scholar of Byzantine history and early Christianity and a hyperpolyglot. He is a professor at the Central European University in Vienna, Austria. He holds a doctorate from the Hungarian Academy of Sciences. He is one of the leading experts on Dionysius the Areopagite and the Saint Thomas Christians of Kerala. Since 2000 he has led a project to explore and digitalize the Syriac and Malayalam manuscripts of the Saint Thomas Christians in South India. He has initiated the study of Classical Syriac as a modern Indian lingua franca and of Garshuni Malayalam.

According to his university profile, he knows Ancient Greek, Latin, Classical Syriac, Garshuni Malayalam and Church Slavonic, speaks Hungarian, English, French, Modern Greek, Russian, Italian, German and Ktobonoyo and has a working knowledge of Hebrew, Malayalam and Old Portuguese.

== Most important publications ==
- "Malayalam Garshuni: A Witness to an Early Stage of Indian Christian Literature," in Hugoye: Journal of Syriac Studies 17, 2 (2014): 263–323.
- "The Pseudo-Didymian De trinitate and Pseudo-Dionysius the Areopagite: A Preliminary Study", in: Studia Patristica 58/6: Neoplatonism and Patristics (Leuven-Paris-Walpole, MA: Peeters): 83–108.
- "Pseudo-Dionysius the Areopagite and the Pseudo-Dormition of the Holy Virgin," in: Le Muséon 125/1-2 (2012): 55–97.
- "Classical Syriac as a modern lingua franca in South India between 1600 and 2006," in: Modern Syriac Literature, ARAM Periodical 21 (2009): 289–321.
- The Nomocanon of Metropolitan Abdisho of Nisibis: A Facsimile Edition of MS 64 from the Collection of the Church of the East in Thrissur (Piscataway, NJ: Gorgias Press, 2005), 426 pp. ISBN 1-59333-133-9
- The Eucharist in Theology and Philosophy: Issues of Doctrinal History in East And West from the Patristic Age to the Reformation, ed. István Perczel, Réka Forrai, and György Geréby (Leuven: University Press, 2005), 474 pp. ISBN 90-5867-499-1
- Incomprehensibility and condescension. Metaphysics and Mysticism in Saint Augustine and Saint John Chrysostom, Atlantisz Publishers, Budapest, 1999, ISBN 9639165107, 248 pp.

== See also ==
- Synod of Diamper
