= Thoma I =

17th-century Saint Thomas Christian bishop

Mar Thoma I Malankara Metropolitan
- Archdeacon of All India; Malankara Metropolitan
- Church: Malankara Church
- Diocese: Malankara Syrian Church
- Installed: 22 May 1653
- Term ended: 1670
- Predecessor: Giwargis of the Cross

Orders
- Consecration: regularized in 1665

Personal details
- Born: Parambil Thoma Kuravilangad
- Died: 25 April 1670 Angamaly
- Buried: St. Mary's Jacobite Syrian Orthodox Church, Angamaly
Parambil Thoma
- Archdeacon of Angamaly
- Appointed: in 1937 by Stephen Britto
- Predecessor: Arkadeacon Givargis of the Cross
- Successor: post abolished

Mar Thoma I, also called Parampil Thoma (Thomas de Campo in Portuguese), was the first native-born bishop of the Malankara Church. He was the last archdeacon of the undivided body of Saint Thomas Christians in India.

Thoma was elevated to the dynastic archdeaconate following the death of his uncle, Archdeacon George of the Cross, while still being under 30 years old. He was the main protagonist of the Coonan Cross Oath, which secured the independence of the local Christians from the colonial Padroado administration and the Jesuits. Following the Oath, Thoma was declared as a bishop by his supporters who met in Alangad on 22 May 1653. During his tenure, Thoma was assisted by Anjilimoottil Itty Thomman and, briefly, by Kadavil Chandy, Vengoor Giwargis and his own cousin, Parambil Chandy, who later reunited with the Catholic Church when the Portuguese and the Jesuits were replaced by the Carmelites sent by the pope.

Thoma began to exercise episcopal powers and later sought to confirm his consecration from the Syriac Orthodox Church of Antioch. Subsequently, he was formally consecrated in 1665 by Mar Gregorios Abdal Jaleel, a delegate of the Syriac Orthodox Patriarch of Antioch, though the exact date and location of this event remain unknown.

== Early life ==
Kuravilangad is a town located in the Kottayam district of Kerala, South India. The town is situated in the Meenachil Taluk, about 22 km north of Kottayam. He was born as Giwargis' sister's son hailing from the house of Parampil, a branch of the Pakalomattom family based in Kuravilangad.

== Archdeacon ==
=== Appointment ===
Thoma Parampil was appointed archdeacon following the death of Giwargis of Cross, either in 1637 or 1640, by Archbishop Estevao Brito of Cranganore. Thoma's tenure witnessed the death of Brito in 1941 and the immediate elevation of Francisco Garcia Mendes as Brito's successor. Garcia had been repulsive to the rights of the archdeacon since his tenure as the co-adjutor of Brito. Garcia consistently disregarded the agreement made between his predecessor and Archdeacon Giwargis. The agreement between Brito and Giwargis had affirmed the traditional rights of the archdeacon. For this reason, disputes began between Garcia and Thoma from the very beginning.

=== Conflict with Garcia ===
By 1645, Thoma formed a front against Garcia, with the support of the 'Recollects of Saint Thomas' based in Edappally (Rapolim). The Recollects of Saint Thomas was a religious order founded for the native Christian clergy by Archbishop Brito. In December, 1645, Kadavil Chandy, an experienced writer among the supporters of the Thoma, presented the Portuguese Viceroy Filipe Mascarenhas in Kochi a letter of complaint against Garcia. Thoma showed the Viceroy the document of settlement reached between the Brito and Giwargis of Cross.

Meanwhile, Garcia and the Jesuits had begun moves against the archdeacon. They accused Thoma of secessionist activities against the archbishop, in the kingdoms of Mangat and Vatakkumkūr, and misappropriation of funds of the Cathedral of Angamaly and Church of Kuravilangad. Following this, a compromise was signed between the two at the compulsion of the viceroy. It recommended the archbishop to seek the archdeacon's concurrence in administrative acts, but the archbishop was empowered to exclude the archdeacon whenever he wanted to. The viceroy's settlement, as expected by the viceroy himself, could not end the dispute. Garcia replaced the vicars of Diamper and Kottayam without the archdeacon's concurrence. The appointment of vicars of Anjicaimal and Vaipicotta Churches were already a point of contention for Thoma. Thoma accused the archbishop of not complying with the settlement, while the archbishop retaliated by accusing him of deceiving the faithful by forging a fake translation of the document. In fact, the Thoma's version of the concord closely resembled that of Brito's grant and omitted the restrictive clauses in support of the archbishop. Hyacinth Magistris, Secretary of Garcia, started visiting the native churches and implementing harsh penalties against the Thoma's supporters. The archdeacon expressed his willingness for reconciliation with the archbishop. Garcia put forward two conditions: first that the agreement between the former archbishop and the archdeacon be surrendered to him and that a true translation of the new agreement be made and submitted to him without omitting the provisions favorable to the archbishop. Thoma did not agree with either of his conditions.

==== Complete Fall Out ====
After attempts at reconciliation between the two failed, Thoma went to the parishes in the South and passed resolutions against the archbishop. Those parishes decided not to accept vicars appointed by the Archbishop and instead decided to accept vicars from their proximity. By this time, Garcia already began implementing his arbitrary appointments in churches in the north. Therefore, Thoma tried to reach a compromise with the Archbishop again, but Garcia was not willing to budge even a little. Garcia ignored the traditional role of the archdeacon by appointing Jerome Furtado as his vicar general. Roz and Brito, even when they were in conflict with the archdeacon, had always recognized him as their ex-officio vicar general as mandated by the diocesan synod of 1603 and the Rozian Statutes of 1606. The monastic orders like the Dominicans and Carmelites began to support Thoma. Through them, Thoma submitted complaints to the Pope. However, none of these letters were answered. Thoma, who had been waiting for answers, chose to remain silent without causing any further problems. Meanwhile, Portuguese King decided in favour of Garcia in 1647, causing the King of Cochin to shift his favour from the archdeacon to the archbishop. By 1649, without Garcia's permission, Thoma moved to the Kingdom of Edappally and became a member of the Recollects. Having apparently cornered Thoma, Garcia initiated judicial steps to excommunicate him. Although Thoma continued to try to reach a compromise with Garcia, Garcia was not ready to make any compromise in his previous conditions. Garcia placed the two churches of Edappally, which housed the archdeacon, under interdict.

In December, 1649, Thoma sought the help of Carmelite friar Joseph Alexis, the founder of a chapel and confraternity in Kuravilangad, to send letters to the pope. But these did not reach before 1655. Meanwhile, Thoma also wrote letters addressed to the patriarchs of the Oriental Churches, the Coptic Patriarch in Cairo and possibly also to the Jacobite and Chaldean Patriarchs. Nothing is known about the fate of the letters sent to the latter two. However, the Coptic Patriarch, who took an active interest in it, showed the letter to Elzeario Sansay, a French Capuchin intermediating a proposed union between the Coptic church and Rome. Sansay proposed to the Propaganda Fide the sending of Andreas Abdegalis, a Catholic convert from the Jacobite church in Aleppo, to Malabar. As there was no response from Rome, the Coptic Patriarch recommended the opportunity to a Jacobite metropolitan from Damascus who was then living in Cairo and had recently converted to Catholicism. It was Cyril Atallah Ibn Issa, one of the most notable figures in the later history of the Saint Thomas Christianity.

== Revolution of 1653 ==
By 1652, a facade of silence and peace had spread throughout the Malabar Church. Garcia and the Jesuits interpreted it as a defeat of the archdeacon. But beneath the apparent calm lurked an explosive anguish of the natives against the tyranny of the Padroado archbishop and the Jesuits. Garcia's supporters warned him every now and then that an arrival of an oriental bishop could be disastrous for him. Thoma knew that his attempts to seek protection for his traditional rights were going in vain. His complaints to Rome and Lisbon were being intercepted by Garcia's agents. In case if some reach their destinations, the Jesuits would block any reciprocation in his favour. Even if he gets a favourable order, Garcia would certainly impede its implementation.

=== Ahatallah in India ===
Ahatallah, who received the commission from the Coptic Patriarch, departed for India. Ahattalla arrived at the port of Surat in the guise of an ordinary Christian monk and from there boarded a Dutch ship, bypassing Goa and Kochi, and disembarked in Madras. On August 23, he approached the Capuchins for help but they detained him and handed him over to the Jesuits in Mylapore. The Jesuits, suspicious of Ahatalla's clerical credentials, detained him. Meanwhile, three Mar Thoma Christian priests, namely George Kuriath Parampil of Kuravilangad, Zacharias Itti from Chengannur and Zacharias Cherian Unni from Ambazhakkad, and a layman, named George Kuruvila Perical, who had arrived in Mylapore from Malabar on pilgrimage met him. As they were leaving, they were given a letter addressed to the leaders of the Marthoma Christians.

In Mylapore, Ahatallah introduced himself as 'Ignatius, 'Patriarch of All India and China'. He also claimed that he had arrived with full authority from the Pope.

=== Thoma takes up the cause ===
The news about the oriental prelate made the native Christians excited. They met in Udayamperoor and discussed their further steps. They wrote to Garcia seeking his co-operation in bringing him to Malabar. Garcia declared that "even if the Patriarch were sent by the Supreme Pontiff, we cannot grant him to you, for he has not brought the beneplacet of our King." The enraged archdeacon and his supporters argued that Garcia should be immediately replaced by Ahatallah. But others felt that it would be better for Ahatallah to take over after Garcia's death. They decided to reassemble in Mattancherry to discuss further steps. Kadavil Chandy went to meet Garcia and informed him about the anguish his reply has caused among them, but they returned insulted. Garcia challenged them that if his subjects rebelled, he knew how to tame them and all the money he might spend for that purpose would later be recouped from them.

==== Ahatallah Incident ====
Soon, Marcel de Leyva, the rector of the Jesuit College in Mylapore, secretly wrote to the Garcia about Ahatalla's activities and, on their instructions, sent him to Cochin. Immediately upon learning of this, Thoma arrived in Kochi with his supporters. There, Thoma sought permission from the civil and ecclesiastical authorities there to see Ahatalla on his arrival and examine his credentials. The Portuguese authorities in Cochin were initially sympathetic to their pleas. However they later refused, at the influence of Garcia and other Jesuit hardliners, who declared: "Don't worry, we won't lose the Serra, for willy-nilly they have to come to their true prelate for the holy Orders". Although Captain Antonio Meneses had initially allowed Thoma and eight priests to inspect the prelate's credentials, he withdrew the offer and did not allow even Thoma to board the ship. They replied to the archdeacon that no such bishop could be legally appointed to India without the Portuguese's approval, and that Ahatallah was a treacherous Nestorian monk. After two days, they informed the archdeacon that Ahatalla had already been sent to Goa for Inquisition. Thoma had been escorted by priests and many armed men to Mattancherry. To prevent a possible attack on the Portuguese and Jesuits by the native Christians, they spread the story that the unfortunate Ahatalla had accidentally drowned in the sea. This lie, told by the Portuguese to calm the people, actually angered them. They thought that Ahatalla was drowned in the Cochin Sea by the Portuguese.

=== Coonan Cross Oath ===
After the news of Ahatalla's death spread, representatives of the native Christians gathered at the Church of the Virgin Mary in Mattancherry on January 3, 1653. They called on Garcia, who was then in Cochin, to arrive and address their grievance within a day. Garcia not only ignored this, but was not prepared to budge. Consequently they vowed that they would never recognise Garcia as their prelate or subject themselves to the Portuguese Jesuits (Paulists). With this act, independence from Padroado rule was declared. Their leaders later met at the Edappally church. When informed of the oath, Garcia reportedly said: "They espoused me to a black spouse, but if she doesn't want me, and repudiates me, frankly I don't care; the devil can take her."

== 'Consecration' and Schism ==
Following the Coonan Cross Oath, Thoma and his supporters met again at Edappally on February 5, coinciding with this was the three-day fast celebration which attracted a large crowd. Anjilimoottil Ittithomman, one of Thoma's major supporters, produced two more letters claiming to have been written by Ahatallah. The last letter described a ceremony for the consecration of a bishop by twelve priests. They therefore decided to elevate Archdeacon Thoma to the position of Metropolitan, which they had previously thought would be held by Ahatalla.

However, these two letters are most likely not authentic and may even be forgeries fabricated by Itti Thomman himself as later testified by George Parampil. Some were skeptical about this strange ceremony, but enthusiasm regarding Ahatallah's letters and anguish against the Portuguese ensured that the ceremonies would proceed as planned. Accordingly, they again met on May 22, 1653 in Alangad. One of the letters, allegedly from Ahatalla, was placed on the head of Archdeacon Thoma, and the twelve priests performed the consecration using an old East Syriac ritual text. Only a few people and two Southist churches, namely Kaduthuruthy and Udayamperoor, objected this. Thoma began ordaining clerics within a few weeks of the ceremony. Garcia realized he had lost his leverage and started bribing the local kings. These efforts were successful only in the Kingdom of Parur, as the kingdoms like Kochi, Kaduthuruthy, Kottayam, and Purakad, were preoccupied in wars with each other.

=== Rome's Response ===
As the struggle between Portuguese Jesuits and the dissident native Christians reached a standstill, Rome sent a Carmelite priest named Giuseppe Sebastiani to Malabar in 1656. In 1661, Sebastiani was consecrated bishop and sent as Apostolic Commissary with faculties to consecrate Thoma as bishop, if the latter repents and submits. But Thoma could not come to terms with Sebastiani. Sebastiani, on the other hand, wanted to continue as bishop in Malabar. But with the Dutch conquest of the city of Cochin from the Portuguese, Sebastiani was forced to leave Malabar. On February 1, 1663, he consecrated Parampil Chandy, a cousin of Thoma and gave him the authority to exclude the Jesuits from Church and to engage with those who remained with Thoma. Simultaneously, Thoma and his close associates were declared excommunicated.

=== Rise of Dutch power ===
The Dutch East India Company (Vereenigde Oost-Indische Compagnie or VOC in old-spelling Dutch, literally "United East Indian Company") was established in 1602. By 1652, VOC trading posts were established in Malabar Coast in India. On 7 January 1663, Cochin was attacked and the king of Cochin surrendered to the Dutch on 20 March 1663.

=== West Syriac Relationship ===
With Chandy canonically consecrated as a bishop, most of the churches originally under Thoma's control joined Chandy's side. With this, Thomas began to move to protect his power. He corresponded with the Jesuits who were based in Ambazhakad. These discussions stalled on the condition that he be prepared to stop claiming to be a bishop. But in the meantime, Gregorios Abdal Jalīl, a bishop sent by the Jacobite Patriarch in response to Thoma's letter arrived in Malabar. Thomas received him. Thoma and his supporters eventually entered into a new relationship with the Jacobite Patriarch of Antioch. This officiated the gradual schism of Saint Thomas Christians into the Palayakoottukar (Old Party) and Puttankoottukar (New Party) factions.

== Regularization of consecration ==
By 1665, Cochin was under Dutch control. That year Gregorios Abdal Jaleel, a delegate of the Patriarch of Antioch came to Malankara as per the request of Mar Thoma and regularized his Metropolitan consecration.

== Death ==
He died on 25 April 1670 and was buried in St. Mary's Jacobite Soonoro Cathedral, Angamaly.

== See also ==
- Malankara Metropolitan
- List of Malankara metropolitans

Preceded by Archdeacon Geevarghese	Last archdeacon of the Malankara Church; 1640–1653	Succeeded by Title abolished

Preceded by No predecessor	First metropolitan of the St Thomas Christians; 1653–1670	Succeeded by Mar Thoma II
