= Padroado =

Historical diplomatic arrangement

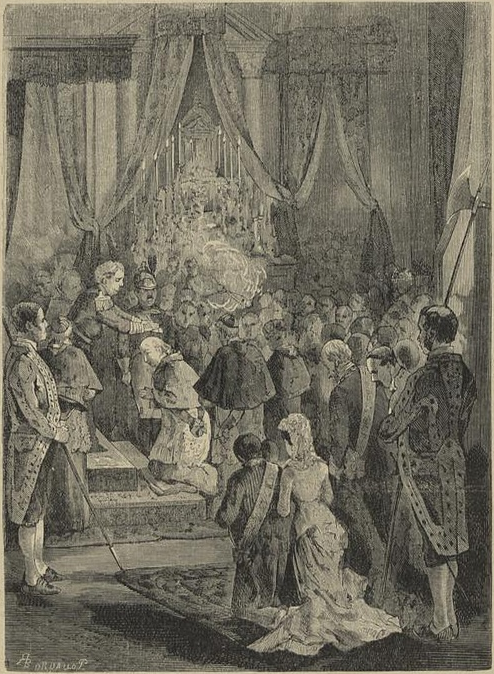
Américo Ferreira dos Santos Silva receives the cardinal's red hat from King Luís I, in 1879

The Padroado (Portuguese pronunciation: [pɐðɾuˈaðu], "patronage") was an arrangement between the Holy See and the Kingdom of Portugal and later the Portuguese Republic, through a series of concordats by which the Holy See delegated the administration of the local churches and granted some theocratic privileges to Portuguese monarchs.

The Portuguese Padroado dates from the beginning of the Portuguese maritime expansion in the mid-15th century and was confirmed by Pope Leo X in 1514. At various times the system was called Padroado Real (Royal patronage), Padroado Ultramarino Português (Portuguese Overseas Patronage) and, since 1911 (following the Portuguese Law on the Separation of Church and State), Padroado Português do Oriente (Portuguese Patronage of the East). The system was progressively dismantled throughout the 20th century.

When the Empire of Brazil became independent from Portugal in 1822, in addition to the Catholic faith being confirmed as the official religion of the new state, the Padroado regime was retained, with all its institutions and privileges (now vested, regarding Brazil, in the emperor and in his government), and this was recognized by the Holy See in 1826. Shortly after Brazil became a republic in 1889, the Padroado was abolished in the country, by the same decree that enacted the separation of Church and state on 7 January 1890.

== History ==
The Padroado originated when the Portuguese kings took the initiative to explore the coasts of Africa. They pushed to the east, seeking to find new areas for trade. Successive popes granted wide-ranging favors and authorities to the kings, who claimed they were given irrevocable powers to establish and patronize churches and bishoprics in lands opened to Portuguese trade in South Asia.

The Padroado was the privilege, granted by the popes to the Crown of Portugal, of designating candidates for the sees and ecclesiastical benefices in the vast domains acquired through the expeditions of its navigators and captains in Africa and the East Indies. This concession, which brought to the King of Portugal a certain portion of the ecclesiastical revenues of his kingdom, carried the condition that he should send good missionaries to his new subjects, and that he should provide with a fitting endowment such dioceses, parishes, and religious establishments as should be established in his acquired territories.

In the course of time this patronage became the source of unpleasant annoyances to the Holy See and one of the chief obstacles to the progress of the missions. The main cause of this regrettable change was the failure of Portugal to observe the conditions agreed upon at the time of the bestowal of the privilege. Another reason was the disagreement between Portugal and the Holy See with regard to the extent of the patronage, for, while Rome maintained that it had never granted the privilege except for actually acquired territory, Lisbon claimed the right for all the countries east of a line designated by the Treaty of Tordesillas between Spain and Portugal. In virtue of this interpretation the Portuguese Government contested the papal right to appoint, without its consent, missionary bishops or vicars apostolic in countries which were never subject to its dominion, such as the greater part of India, Tonkin, Cochin-China, Siam, and especially China.

As Portuguese influence in the East waned, the Congregation for the Propagation of the Faith began to assume more responsibility for maintaining the missions. This gave rise in some instances to the existence of two rival jurisdictions: Padroado and Propaganda. This was not finally resolved until 1886, when a concordat was drawn up, and a Bull ("Humanae Salutatis Auctor", 1 September 1886) issued, by which the respective jurisdictions were clarified and agreed to.

The Inquisition functioned more to determine secular politics than its genuine religious function. The Padroado was modified over time, but its vestiges were not suppressed until the Second Vatican Council concluded in 1965. For example, until the Council, it was the head of the Portuguese state who bestowed the cardinal's red biretta on the Patriarch of Lisbon.

Historically, this system caused some problems, especially in the years leading up to the Second Vatican Council. An example was the island-state of Singapore, where the Portuguese mission, under the Padroado, operated Saint Joseph's Church independently of the Roman Catholic mission and later the Archdiocese of Singapore. This led to a situation of dual ecclesiastical administration. The situation had to eventually be resolved via a diplomatic settlement between the governments of Portugal and the Holy See. This was in line with the Second Vatican Council, in which the Holy See actively asked governments to give up and annul treaties or privileges similar to the Padroado. St. Joseph's Church eventually came under the administration of the Roman Catholic Archdiocese of Singapore. Due to issues relating to parish culture and Portuguese missionary activity, however, the church was granted certain privileges and to this day is not officially considered a parish church.

The last official remnant of the Padroado ended when control of Macau was ceded to China. Until then, the Portuguese administration assured pensions for Catholic missionaries in this territory.

== See also ==
- Padroado-Propaganda Schism
- Patronato real, a similar arrangement with Spain
- History of Roman Catholicism in Brazil
- Romanus Pontifex
- Protectorate of missions
- Christianity and colonialism

== Sources ==
- Donald F. Lach, Asia in the Making of Europe, vol. 1: The Century of Discovery (Book 1 of 2), Chicago and London: The University of Chicago Press, 1965, pp. 230–245 (The Portuguese "Padroado" [Patronage] of the East)
- E. Wijeysingha (2006), Going Forth. The Catholic Church in Singapore 1819-2004, ISBN 981-05-5703-5
