= Jornada of Alexis Menezes =

Portuguese travelogue published in 1606

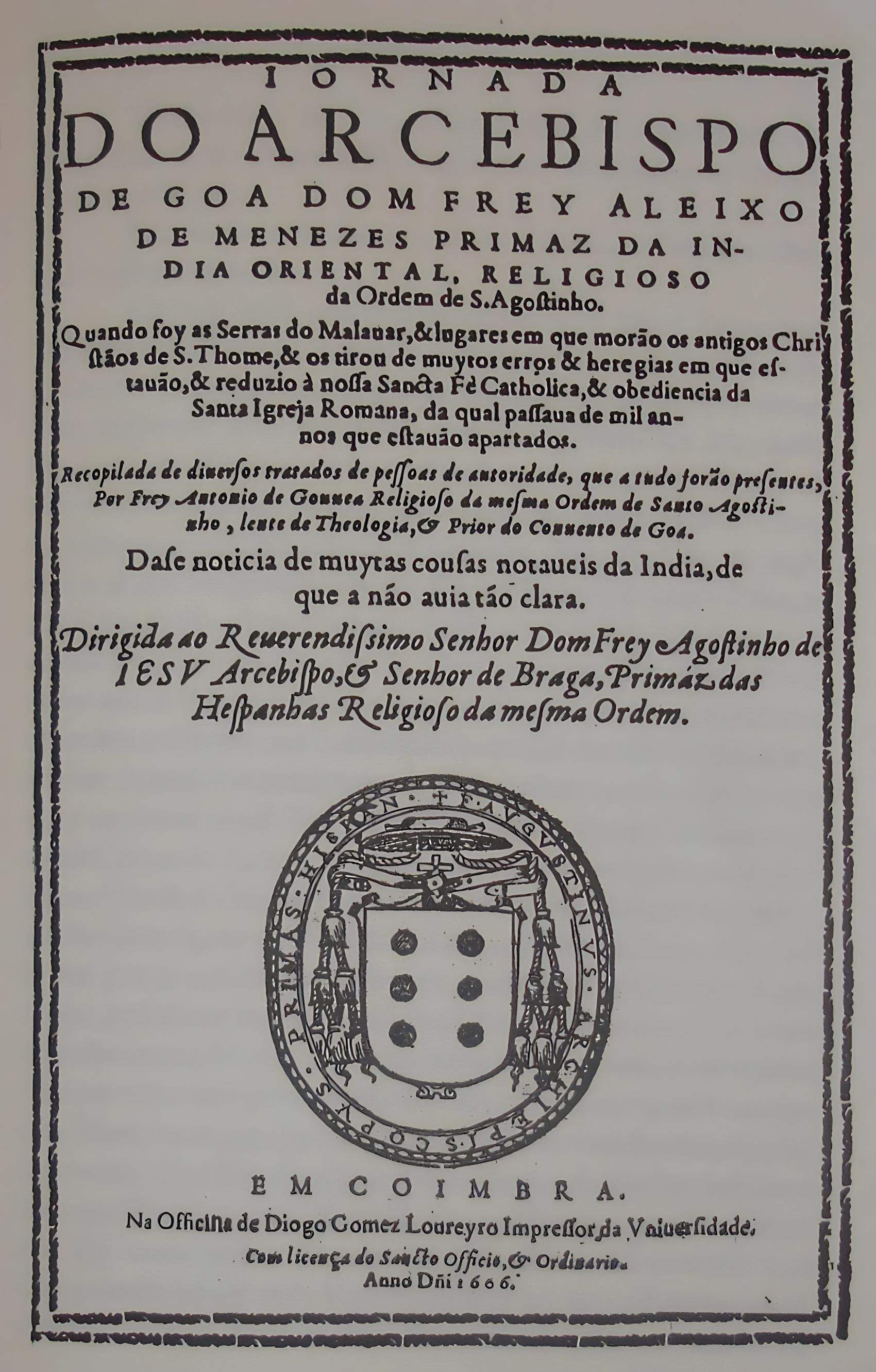
- Original title: Jornada do Arcebispo de Goa Frey Aleixo de Menezes Primaz da India Orientali, Religioso da Ordem de S. Agostinho. Quando foy as Serras do Malavar, & Lugares em que marâo os antigos Christâos de S. Thome & os tirou de muytos erros & obdeiencia da Santa Igreja Romana, da qual passava de mil annos que estavâo & reduzio à nossa Sancta Fè Catholica, & obediencia da Santa Igreja Romana, da qual passava de mil annosqhe estavâo apartados.
- Translators: François Muñoz (Spanish); Jean-Baptiste de Glen (French); Pius Malekandathil (English)
- Language: Portuguese language
- Publication date: 1606
- Publication place: Coimbra, Habsburg Empire

Jornada of Alexis Menezes (Jornada do Arcebispo de Goa Dom Frey Alexio de Menezes...) or The Journey of Alexis Menezes is a seventeenth century travelogue. Written originally in Portuguese by Augustinian friar Antonio Gouvea, it provides a detailed account of the journeys and activities of Alexis Menezes during his term as the Archbishop of Goa and Governor of Portuguese India. It provides a Portuguese account of the late sixteenth and early seventeenth century South India, Ethiopia and, especially, the Saint Thomas Christian community and the region of Malabar.

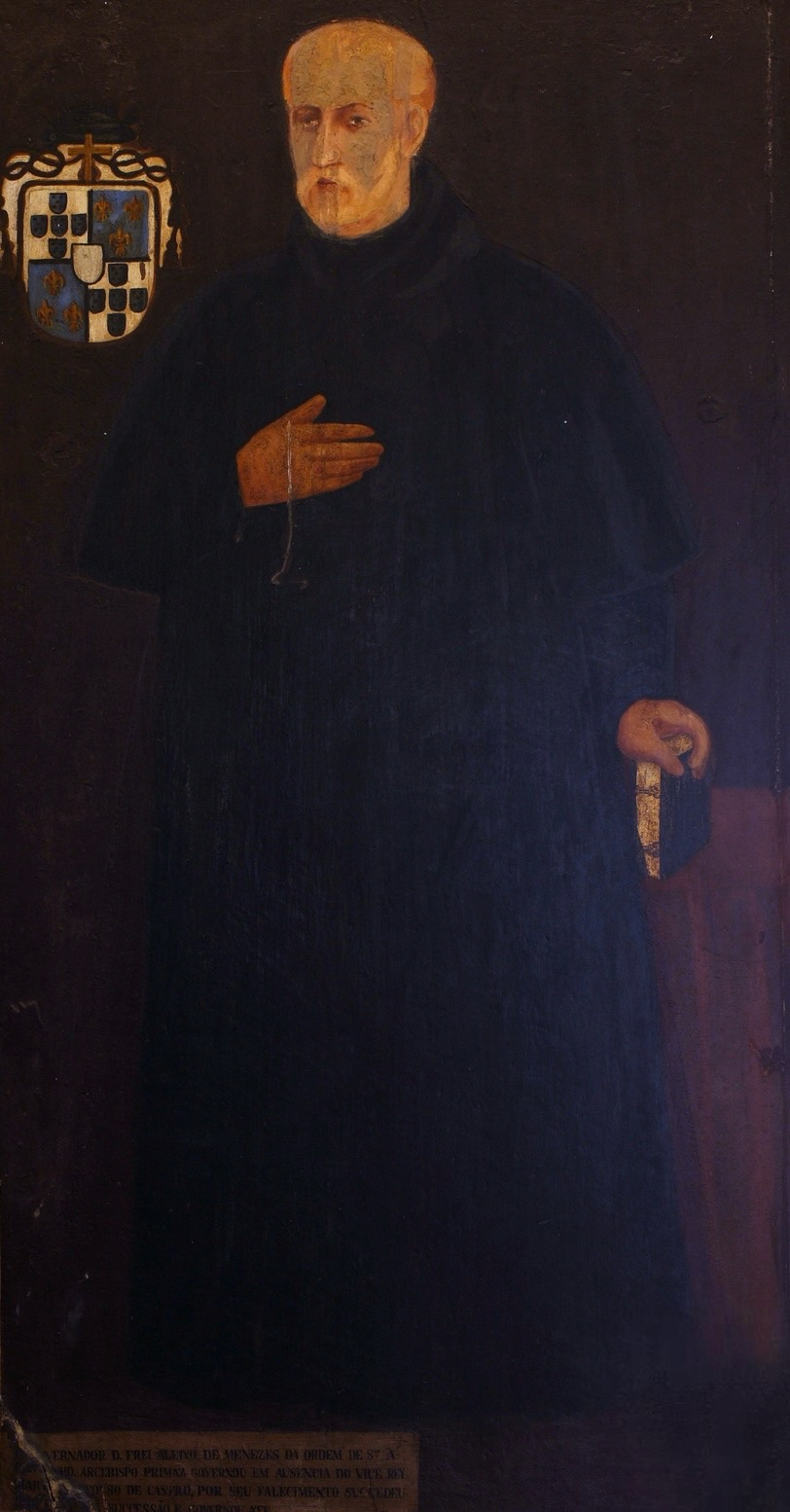
Alexis Menezes

== Content ==
The Jornada of Menezes provides a detailed hagiographic account of the activities of Alexis Menezes in order to subjugate the Indian Saint Thomas Christians (Nazranis) to the Portuguese crown and the Latin Church, during his tenure as Archbishop of Goa during 1595–1612 and thereby the defacto caeseropapist figure of the Portuguese possessions in India and the Far East. It details his extensive journeys and political engagements with local rulers in Malabar in order to consolidate support for his latinization programme and the Portuguese trade and territorial ambitions. This work glorifies the person of Menezes' and his tenure in India in order to create a charismatic impression in the European Catholic circles to advance his personal political and ecclesiastical claims in Portugal. Gouvea, by portraying Menezes as an Augustinian Messiah, also seeks to promote the Augustinian efforts to reassert their ecclesiastical footing which had been heavily impacted by the Protestant reformation triggered by Martin Luther, a former Augustinian. In addition, this work provides primary information about the socio-political situation in the then Malabar and the social background of the Nazranis. It also mentions the various kingdoms and towns in the sixteenth century Malabar while describing the churches and Nazrani settlements.

The Jornada is written in three parts. The first consists of 22 chapters and describes the origins and history of the Christian community in India. This book claims that the Nasranis originate from the apostolic mission of Thomas the Apostle in South India and that they fell into the Nestorian heresy by associating with the Church of the East. This book describes Menezes' accession as Archbishop of Goa in 1595 and details his first trip to the churches in Malabar, the difficulties he faced during his journey, and the opposition he faced from the Christians. The book also details his political and strategic maneuvers to convene the Synod of Diamper and advance his Latinization programme in Malabar by forcibly curbing local dissent and securing the submission of the Nazranis and their archdeacon.

The second part describes Menezes' visits to the churches of the Nasranis after the Diamper Synod. The purpose of this visit is to implement the decisions of the Synod in local parishes. Meanwhile, the author portrays the resistance from the Christians in many places as isolated incidents. The author also describes how Menezes, through his personal charisma, neutralizes such resistance and brings the locals under his sphere of influence. The author exaggerates the isolation of Menezes' opponents, their punishment by incurring divine wrath, and their return to the right path under the influence of Menezes.

The third book begins with Menezes' departure from Malabar. It portrays the Christians' request for Menesis to become their metropolitan in Malabar and his outward readiness if the Pope and the Portuguese king so decide. It also mentions the activities carried out during the journey through Calicut, Mangalore, Basrur, and Honawar. Unlike the first two parts, the last book also describes the extensive activities of the Portuguese in wider Asia. It mentions the island of Socotra in the Arabian Sea, the christian Bedouins there, and their customs. The book also describes Menezes sending Augustinian monks to Shah Abbas I of Persia. It also mentions his missionary activities in Ethiopia. The author here indicates that Menezes, who brought the East Syriac metropolitan province of India under his control, assumed and fulfilled its ancient responsibilities in the wider maritime regions of the Indian Ocean and China.

== List of churches ==
Alexis Menezes' Jornada provides the first detailed information about the Saint Thomas Christian churches that existed during the Synod of Diamper. It lists 77 churches among which 72 are mentioned Saint Thomas Christian parish churches. These 72 churches are classified as constituents of the Diocese of Angamaly in the Synod of Diamper.

List of Churches in Jornada (based on Malekandathil's translated edition of the Jornada)
Name of Settlement	Location	Name of Church	Patron Saint	Description	Current Identification	Earlier Accounts	Later Accounts
Pallur	Kingdom of Zamorin	Cyriacus the Martyr		It is the northernmost of the Christian settlements and is located five leagues away from Panane. Menesis did not personally visit the churches in the Kingdom of Zamorin. Some of the members of the church were present in the Synod of Diamper. They were asked to implement the decisions in the churches under Zamorin. Menesis exchanged letters with the church in Pallur.	Palayur, Thrissur district	Denha (Note: It is listed as one of the three most important Christian centers in Malabar.)	Roz (Note: Palur. Roz documents that the church is dedicated to St. Quirce the martyr. Roz states that this church is from where Christians founded and moved to the other three settlements in the interior of the Kingdom of Zamorin.); Campori (Note: Palur. Campori documents Roz's visit to the Zamorin's kingdom and the three churches therein.); Fenichio (Note: Pallur. Fenichio calls Pallur the Primus among the churches in Malabar. He documents that the church is dedicated to St. Quiricus and is famous for miracles.); Sebastiani (Note: Pallour. He calls Palur, "primo luogo della Christianita della Serra" the primary place of Christianity in Malabar.); Raulin (Note: Palur.); Du Perron (Note: Pallour. Anquetil-Duperron states that this church is dedicated to 'St. Macarie' and belonging to the 'Syrian Catholics'.); Paulinus (Note: Palur. Paulinus states that this church is dedicated to 'St. Machari' and was destroyed during the attack by Tipu.)
Anamaque	Kingdom of Zamorin				Enamavu, Thrissur district	-	Roz (Note: Enamaque. Roz states that the church is dedicated to the 'Virgin Mother of God'.); Campori (Note: Enamaque.); Raulin (Note: Enamaco. Raulin mentions a Jesuit oratory in the place.); Duperron (Note: Enamakal. Anquetil-Duperron mentions the church as dedicated to St. Mary and belonging to the 'Latin Catholics'.); Paulinus (Note: Enamaca. The church dedicated to St. Mary was destroyed during Tipu's attack.)
Mutem	Kingdom of Zamorin				Mattom, Thrissur district	-	Roz (Note: Mattâo. Roz says the church is dedicated to St. Thomas.); Campori (Note: Matherthe. Campori documents that this church was burnt down in a war between the Zamorin and the King of Cochin and was soon repaired by the Zamorin.); Raulin (Note: Mattatil.); Duperron (Note: Mattatile. Anquetil-Duperron mentions the church as dedicated to St. Mary and belonging to the 'Syrian Catholics'.); Paulinus (Note: Mattatil. The church dedicated to St. Mary was destroyed during Tipu's attack.)
Chatacolangaree	Kingdom of Zamorin				Arthat, Thrissur district	-	Raulin (Note: Cottacolongatte.); Duperron (Note: Schatta Kolangouri. Anquetil-Duperron mentions the church as dedicated to St. Mary and as shared among the 'Syrian Catholics' and the 'Schismatics'.)
Angamale	Kingdom of Mangate (Note: Under the governance of two kings distinct from the King of Mangate)	Cathedral	Hormusio the Nestorian, Homisdas	Cathedral Church of the Saint Thomas Christians. It was built by Mar Abraham and he chose his tomb there. Menesis changed its name from 'Hermusio the Abbot' to 'Hormisda the Martyr of Persia'.	Angamaly, Ernakulam district	Menezes (Note: Angamale. Action III Decree X of the Synod of Diamper.)	Sebastiani (Note: Angamali. Sebastiani calls it the 'church of the Archbishop'.); Raulin (Note: Angamale); Duperron (Note: Angamali. Anquetil-Duperron documents that it belongs to the 'Syrian Catholics'.); Paulinus (Note: Paulinus documents that it is dedicated to Saint Hormisdas and is under Catholics. It was spared during Tipu Sultan's attack.)
Angamale	Kingdom of Mangate	Church - 2			Angamaly, Ernakulam district	Carneiro; Gīwārgīs (Note: Manuscript colophons of Vatican Syriac 3 and 2, copied at the Church of Mart Mariam in Angamale by Rabban (monk) Gīwārgīs, on January 26 and May 9 respectively in 1558.); Shem'ōn (Note: Manuscript colophon of Vatican Syriac 85, copied at the Church of Mart Mariam in Angamale by Shem'ōn BarShem'ōn, on 15 December 1562.)	Sebastiani (Note: Angamali. Sebastiani calls it the 'church of the People'.); Raulin (Note: Angamale. Raulin calls it Vinecca Palli.); Duperron (Note: Angamali. Du Perron documents that it is dedicated to Holy Virgin (Saint Mary) and had a chapel dedicated to Saint George. It is shared between the 'Syrian Catholics' and 'Schismatics'.); Paulinus (Note: Paulinus documents that it is dedicated to Saint George and is under the Catholics. It was destroyed during Tipu Sultan's attack.)
Angamale	Kingdom of Mangate	Church - 3			Angamaly, Ernakulam district	Varma (Note: Letter of King Keshava Rama Varma of Cochin to Pope Gregory XIII dated 2 January 1576. The king requests the pope to grant indulgences for the church of the 'Assumption of Our Lady' that Archdeacon George erected in Angamaly.); Gīwargīs of Christ (Note: Archdeacon Gīwargīs of Christ to Alexander Valignano dated April 1577. Gīwargīs requests indulgences to be granted to the Church of St. Mary that he erected in Angamaly.); Alvares (Note: Letter of Gaspar Alvares to Everardo Mercuriano dated 10 January 1580. Alvares speaks of the Feast of the Assumption of Mary at one of the churches in Angamalle of which the Archdeacon of Serra is the founder and administrator.); Gīwargīs of Christ (Note: Letter of Archdeacon Gīwargīs of Christ to Mercuriano dated 15 January 1580. Gīwargīs seeks perpetual indulgences from the pope for the 'Church of Our Lady of Assumption' which he built out of his own and his relatives' expenses. He also seeks to be its permanent administrator and to be allowed to select its future administrators.)	Sebastiani (Note: Angamali. Sebastiani calls it the 'church of the Archdeacon'.); Raulin (Note: Angamale. Raulin calls it Ceria Palli.); Duperron (Note: Angamali. Du Perron writes that it is dedicated to Holy Virgin (Saint Mary) and is known as 'Sheriapalli'. It was the headquarters of Archdeacon Marthoma amd belongs to the 'Schismatics'.); Paulinus (Note: Paulinus documents that it is dedicated to Saint Mary and is under the Jacobites. It was destroyed during Tipu Sultan's attack.)
Agaparambim	Kingdom of Mangate	Marxabro and Marprod the 'Nestorians'; All Saints.		After the Udayamperoor Synod, the church was renamed All Saints.	Akaparambu, Ernakulam district	-	Roz (Note: Roz documents it as a hermitage at Angamale dedicated to Sts. Gervasis and Protasis.); Sebastiani (Note: Agaparambù.); Duperron (Note: Aparam. Anquetil-Duperron states that it is dedicated to Saint Gervasis and was under the Syrian Catholics.); Paulinus (Note: Agaparambil. Paulinus mentions two churches, namely the Jacobite church dedicated to Saints Gervasis and Protasis and the Catholic church dedicated to Saint Mary. Both were destroyed in Tipu's attack.)
Mangate	Kingdom of Mangate (Note: Under the governance of the King of Mangate)	Parish	Holy Virgin		Alangad, Ernakulam district	-	Roz (Note: Mangate. Roz states that church is dedicated to Our Lady.); Sebastiani (Note: Mangati.); Raulin (Note: Mangate. Raulin mentions the church and two convents belonging to Franciscans and Carmelites.); Duperron (Note: Anquetil-Duperron states that this was the most beautiful of the churches in Malabar.); Paulinus (Note: Mangate. Paulinus mentions the church dedicated to Virgin Mary and two oratories, one of which is under the Carmelites.)
Mangate	Kingdom of Mangate	Monte Mangate	Holy Cross	Shrine located on a hilltop near Mangate. It was arsoned by the Amoucos of the King of Paru at night during which the Cross placed on its altar remained unaffected.	Alangad, Ernakulam district		Roz (Note: Hermitage of the Holy Cross. Roz states that the old wooden cross was present in the middle of the village and had a small house thatched with dry palm leaves. Once the settlement was burned up and later the hermitage caught fire, with the Cross remaining unaffected in both fires.); Duperron (Note: Anquetil-Duperron mentions an altar dedicated to the 'exhaltation of the Holy Cross' on a nearby mountain.)
Great Paru	Kingdom of Paru	Church - 1	Thomas the Apostle	Referred to as the most noble of the settlements of Christians of Malabar. Two churches in Paru were two independent parishes.	North Paravur, Ernakulam district	Stone plaque (Note: The stone plaque is preserved in the church. It says that the church was founded by Metropolitan Joseph on 16th day of the month of Vrischika (30 November) in the year 1566.)	Raulin (Note: Raulin lists two churches, each belonging to the Catholics and the Jacobites, in Paru.); Duperron (Note: Anquetil-Duperron states that the church dedicated to St. Thomas belonged to the 'Schismatics'.); Paulinus (Note: Paulinus documents that the Jacobite church dedicated to St. Thomas was destroyed during Tipu's attack.)
Great Paru	Kingdom of Paru	Church - 2	Marxabro and Marprod 'the Nestorians', All Saints	Referred to as the most noble of the settlements of Christians of Malabar. Two churches in Paru were two independent parishes.	North Paravur, Ernakulam district	Jacob (Note: Puraur. In 1556, Jacob documents that the church is dedicated to Mar Shapur and Mar Iapot.)	Roz (Note: Paru. Roz states that the church is dedicated to Sts Gervasis and Protasis.); Sebastiani (Note: Paru.); Raulin; Duperron (Note: Anquetil-Duperron states that the church dedicated to St. Gervasis belonged to the Syrian Catholics.); Paulinus (Note: Paulinus documents that the Catholic church dedicated to Sts. Gervasis and Protasis was destroyed during Tipu's attack.)
Molecalão	Lands of king Muricale	Alexis the Martyr		One of the churches founded by Alexis Menezes. The church was dedicated to the Latin Catholic saint Alexis of Rome.	Mulakulam, Ernakulam district	none	Raulin (Note: Mulicolor.); Duperron (Note: Molecoulam. Anquetil-Duperron documents that this church is dedicated to St. Alexis and is shared among the 'Syrian Catholics' and the 'schismatics'. The church is included under the Kingdom of Barekangour.); Paulinus (Note: Mulicolam.)
Diamper - 1	Kingdom of Cochin	Marxabro and Marprod the 'Nestorians', All Saints		The church hosted the Synod of Diamper in 1599 under Menesis. It was a seat of bishops of the Christians in the past. A tomb of a 'Nestorian' bishop inside the church was highly venerated.	Udayamperoor, Ernakulam district		Roz (Note: Udiamper. Roz states that the church had southists.); Sebastiani (Note: Diamper.); Raulin (Note: Diamper. Raulin states that it is a Catholic church belonging to the 'Syrians'.); Duperron (Note: Odiamper. Anquetil-Duperron states that this church was dedicated to St. Gervasis belonged to the Syrian Catholics.); Paulinus (Note: Paulinus documents that this church was dedicated to Sts. Gervasi and Protasi and was destroyed during Tipu's attack.)
Vaipicota, Chanota	Kingdom of Cochin	Holy Cross		It was a capital of the Villarvattom king. The seminary of the Jesuits was functioning there. It was the first Nazrani church visited by Menesis and the first to submit to the Portuguese.	Chendamangalam, Ernakulam district	-	Sebastiani (Note: Cenota.); Raulin (Note: Canotta.); Duperron (Note: Shennote.); Paulinus (Note: Cenotta. This church was destroyed during Tipu's attack.)
Molandurte	Kingdom of Cochin	Thomas the Apostle		The Christians here received Menezes disregarding the Archdeacon's explicit approbation. Along with Cartute and Diamper, it became one of the most important three Nazrani settlements that supported Menezis.	Mulanthuruthy, Ernakulam district	-	Roz (Note: Molandurte. Roz states that the church is dedicated to St. Thomas the Apostle.); Sebastiani (Note: Molandurte.); Raulin (Note: Molandurti.); Duperron (Note: Mulanthuruthy. Anquetil-Duperron states that this church is dedicated to St. Mary.); Paulinus (Note: Molanturuti.)
Matancher	Kingdom of Cochin			It was known as the 'Cross of the Saint Thomas Christians in Cochin'. This church was located in the vicinity of the Bishopric of Cochin. The Latin bishops of Cochin used to not let the Syrian archbishop or priests enter this church. Here, Menezes, before his departure to meet the Zamorin, converted a local Hindu noble woman. The Nairs of a prince of Cochin murdered her and later uprooted the cross that was planted on a spot in her memory.	Mattancheri, Ernakulam district	-	Roz (Note: Mattancher. Roz states that the church is dedicated to the Holy Cross. Roz also documents the conversion of the young woman but states that a cross had existed there for a long time and was venerated by the Christians.); Raulin (Note: Matingeri. Raulin states that this church belongs to the 'Latins'.); Duperron (Note: Matencheri. Anquetil-Duperron states that this church is dedicated to St. Joseph and is included under the 'Dioxese of Veraple' in the realm of Cochin.); Paulinus (Note: Matincèra. Paulinus states that this church is dedicated to 'St. Mary of Life'.)
Nhagrica	Kingdom of Cochin			Here, Menesis absolved people who had been excommunicated for the past 20 years though the cases should not have been absolved.	Njarackal, Ernakulam district	-	Sebastiani (Note: Gnareca.); Raulin (Note: Gnarica); Duperron (Note: Naraka. Church dedicated to St. Virgin Mary.); Paulinus (Note: Nharica.)
Cheguree	Kingdom of Cochin	Our Lady		Here, Menesis signed an agreement, which says that he would abstain from performing episcopal activities in Syrian churches and simply be a guest, as required by the archdeacon.	Chowara, Ernakulam district	-	Sebastiani (Note: Cegurê.); Raulin (Note: Covere); Duperron (Note: Schouvere.); Paulinus (Note: Covare. Paulinus mentions that the church is dedicated to St. Mary and was destroyed during Tipu's attack.)
Canhur	Kingdom of Cochin	Our Lady			Kanjoor, Ernakulam district	-	Sebastiani (Note: Cagnur.); Raulin (Note: Canchur); Duperron (Note: Cagnore. Anquetil-Duperron states that this church is dedicated to St. Mary and belonged to Syrian Catholics.); Paulinus (Note: Canhur. Paulinus states that the church dedicated to St. Mary was destroyed in Tipu's attack.)
Maleatur	Kingdom of Cochin	Our Lady			Malayattur, Ernakulam district	-	Sebastiani (Note: Maleatur.); Raulin (Note: Meliatur.); Duperron (Note: Malayattur. Anquetil-Duperron says that the church is dedicated to St. Mary and belongs to the 'schismatics'. There was another church on the hilltop dedicated to Holy Cross and belongs to the 'Syrian Catholics'.); Paulinus (Note: Maleatur. Paulinus states that this church is dedicated to St. Thomas and that there is an oratory in the hills nearby.)
Narame	Kingdom of Cochin				Thrippunithura, Ernakulam district	-	Sebastiani (Note: Nadame.); Duperron (Note: Naramel.); Paulinus (Note: Nharamel.)
Pallurte	Kingdom of Cochin			Jacob Cassanar of the church of Pallurte was the spokesman and Malabari interpreter of Menesis at the Synod of Diamper.	Pulluruthy, Ernakulam district	-	Raulin (Note: Palurti.); Duperron (Note: Palluruthi. The church is dedicated to St. Mary and belongs to the 'Syrian Catholics'.); Paulinus (Note: Palurti.)
Vaipin	Kingdom of Cochin	Holy Virgin		Belonged to the Franciscans.	Vypin, Ernakulam district	-	Raulin (Note: Vaipin. Raulin says that it is located close to the church of the 'Miraculous Cross' and that both of these churches belong to the Latins.); Duperron (Note: Baïpim or Vaipin. This church is dedicated to 'Our Lady of Rosary' and belongs to the 'Latin Catholics' and is served by the Dutch.)
Codemangalão	Principalities of Tacheta and Muna Caimal	Our Lady		The principalities of Tacheta and Muna Caimal in which the church belonged to were independent and confederated with the Kingdom of Cochin.	Kothamangalam, Ernakulam district	Mattāi (Note: Kotamamgalam. Colophon of East Syriac breviary (Kaskol) manuscript (Thrissur Syriac 22), copied from the church of Kotamamgalam dedicated to Lady Mary, the Holy Virgin, the Mother of Light and Life, by Corepiscopa Mattāi, son of Yawsep Punnor from the Beth Asmar family in Amid, on 5 September 1585. The ecclesiastical hierarchs are Mar Shim'un as Patriarch of the East and Mar Abraham as Metropolitan of India.)	Raulin (Note: Codangolt.); Duperron (Note: Kothamangalam. Anquetil-Duperron documents three churches in the place, one of which belongs to the 'Syrian Catholics' and the other two were shared between the 'Syrian Catholics' and the 'schismatics'.); Paulinus (Note: Codamangalam. Paulinus mentions two churches in the place, one belonging to the Catholics and the other belonging to the Jacobites.)
Muttão	Kingdom of Muterte (Note: Malekandathil identifies Muterte with historical Muthedath and modern Arthunkal)			This church had a bell which was placed inside the church, just as in other churches which had bells, and rang only before divine offices to avoid inconvenience to the non-Christians.	Muttom, Alappuzha district	-	Roz (Note: Muttâo. Roz states that the church is dedicated to 'Our Lady'.); Sebastiani (Note: Muttono.); Raulin (Note: Mutton.); Duperron (Note: Mouttam. This church was dedicated to Holy Virgin.); Paulinus (Note: Muttam. Paulinus confirms that the church is dedicated to St. Mary.)
Palliporão	'Land of the Pepper Queen' (Note: Raynha da Pimeta. Portuguese appellation for the Vadakkumkoor ruler.)			Majority of the Christians who attended the church lived in Baiquetta on the opposite river bank, but a church or cross could not be founded there due to opposition by the Brahmins. Here the Portuguese triggered unrest among the Brahmins by killing a dove in a temple nearby.	Pallippuram, Alappuzha district	-	Sebastiani (Note: Paliporàm.); Raulin (Note: Palliport (Palliporath).); Duperron (Note: Palliporam.); Paulinus (Note: Pallipuram. The church is dedicated to St. Mary)
Collegayra mangalão, Colligeira mangalão	'Land of the Pepper Queen'	Thomas the Apostle			Kulashekhara mangalam, Kottayam district	-	Campori (Note: Colijeira. Campori says that it is one of the most ancient churches. He further documents that this church is with very few Christians left after it was attacked by the Kingdom of Cochin.)
Carturtte	'Land of the Pepper Queen'	Church - 1	Holy Virgin	Caturte is noted to be the most noble of the places of the Christians in the 'Pepper Kingdom'.	Kaduthuruthy, Kottayam district		Roz (Note: Carturte. Roz states that the presence of two churches in Carturte was attributed to the quarrels between the Southists and the Northists. He further states that the 'Great church of Carturte' had Southists.); Sebastiani (Note: Carturte. Sebastiani speaks of two churches there, namely Great church and Small church.); Raulin (Note: Cartuti.); Duperron (Note: Kadathuruthy. Anquetil-Duperron documents two churches, namely St. Paul and St. Mary, and a Dominican oratory, all three of which were in a dilapidated condition.); Paulinus (Note: Cadauturuti. Paulinus mentions two churches, namely St. Thomas and St. Mary, and a Dominican oratory in the place.)
Carturtte	'Land of the Pepper Queen'	Church - 2	Holy Virgin	Caturte is noted to be the most noble of the places of the Christians in the 'Pepper Kingdom'.	Kaduthuruthy, Kottayam district		Roz; Sebastiani; Raulin; Duperron; Paulinus
Corlengate	'Land of the Pepper Queen'	Virgin Mary		The Archdeacon was a native of this place. Cassanar Jacob the archdeacon of Mar Simon preached his last homily in this church.	Kuravilangad, Kottayam district	Gīwārgīs (Note: Kuravalanar. Manuscript colophon of Syriac gospels, copied from the "celebrated church of Kuravalanar" by priest Jacob, pupil of "Mar Yawsep the Metropolitan of India, China and entire Orient", on 15 August 1563.)	Roz (Note: Corlengate and Quorlengate. Roz states that the church is dedicated to the 'Mother of God'.); Sebastiani (Note: Corolengate. Sebastiani calls this church 'St. Mary Major'.); Raulin (Note: Corolengati.); Duperron (Note: Karlongate. The church belongs to the 'Syrian Catholics'.); Paulinus (Note: Corolongatta. Paulinus states that the church is dedicated to St. Mary Major and that an oratory is present nearby.)
Ignhaperi, Ignapeli	'Land of the Pepper Queen'	Holy Spirit		Cassanar Jacob the supporter of Mar Simon used to live there.	Elanji, Ernakulam (Note: Malekandathil identifies Ignhaperi and Ignapeli as 'Elenji'. However Joseph identifies it with 'Muttuchira', which Malekandathil identifies as Nagpili, owing to its dedication to 'Holy Spirit'.)	-	Raulin (Note: Elognil.); Duperron (Note: Elanji.); Paulinus (Note: Elangnil.)
Nagpili		Holy Spirit		The 'Nestorian' Cassanar Jacob Pakalomattom had first been there.	Muttuchira, Kottayam district	-	Sebastiani (Note: Muttiere. Sebastiani says that this church is dedicated to the Holy Spirit.); Raulin (Note: Mutieri.); Duperron (Note: Muttuchira. Anquetil-Duperron documents that the church was dedicated to the Holy Spirit and had an altar dedicated to St. Sebastian. He also states that the church is in burnt down stage.); Paulinus (Note: Muttiera. Paulinus confirms that the church is dedicated to Holy Spirit and states that it had an oratory dedicated to St. Sebastian.)
Little Paru (Paru pequeno)	'Land of the Pepper Queen'	John the Baptist		Called 'little' to distinguish it with the other settlement with the same name.	South Paravur, Ernakulam district	-	Sebastiani (Note: San Giouanni di Parù.); Duperron (Note: Thekkenparour. The church dedicated to St. John the Baptist which is shared among the 'Syrian catholics' and 'schismatics'.); Paulinus (Note: Tekenparur. Paulinus states that the church is shared between the Jacobites and the Catholics.)
Diamper - 2	'Land of the Pepper Queen'			Located near the border of the 'Land of the Pepper Queen' with the lands of Porcaa and Thecancutes. The church was very small and in a rudimentary condition.	Athirampuzha, Kottayam district (Note: Alencheril identifies this Diamper in the 'Pepper Kingdom' with Athirampuzha. He calls it 'little Diamper'.)	-	Raulin (Note: Advombare.); Duperron (Note: Adrampaje. Anquetil-Duperron states that this church is dedicated to the Holy Virgin, belongs to the 'Syrian Catholics' and is under the Kingdom of Barekangour.); Paulinus (Note: Adirampushe. Paulinus states that this church is dedicated to St. Mary and belongs to the 'Catholic Church'.)
Poligunde	'Land of the Pepper Queen'	Our Lady			Pulinkunnu, Alappuzha district	-	Raulin (Note: Pulingune.); Duperron (Note: Pulinkunnel.); Paulinus (Note: Pulingunne. Paulinus states that this church is dedicated to St. Mary and there was an oratory dedicated to St. Sebastian nearby.)
Prouto	'Land of the Pepper Queen'	Three Kings		Here, Menezes saw opposition against his attempts to enforce the sacrament of confession.	Piravom, Ernakulam district	-	Raulin (Note: Farete.); Duperron (Note: Piravom. Anquetil-Duperron says that the church is dedicated to the Holy Magi and is shared between the 'Syrian Catholics' and the 'schismatics'.); Paulinus (Note: Parrota.)
Baragore	'Land of the Pepper Queen'	John the Baptist			Vadakara, Ernakulam district	-	Duperron (Note: Baragarou.); Paulinus (Note: Badagare.)
Aracore	'Land of the Pepper Queen'	Our Lady			Arakkuzha, Ernakulam district	-	Duperron (Note: Arakuzha.); Paulinus (Note: Aaragoshe.)
Turubule, Terubulie, Turugure	Kingdom of Turubule	Thomas the Apostle (Note: Malekandathil is of the belief that, actually, Malucombil was dedicated to St. Thomas, Marubuli was dedicated to St. George and, probably, Turubule was dedicated to St. Mary.)		The King of Turubule is affiliated to the 'Queen of the Pepper Kingdom'	Thodupuzha, Idukki district (Note: Malekandathil states that Turubule or 'Thodupuzha' is different from 'Chunkom' owing to the account by Carneiro who writes about three churches in proximity.)	Carneiro	Roz (Note: Turigure. Roz states that the church in Turigure had Southists.); Sebastiani (Note: Turgoli, Turgolin, and Turgolino. Sebastiani states that Southists were present in great numbers in Turgoli. He documents that Turgolin is also called Giuncotti.); Raulin (Note: Turguli.)
Turubule, Terubulie, Turugure	Kingdom of Turubule	Thomas the Apostle		The King of Turubule is affiliated to the 'Queen of the Pepper Kingdom'	Chunkom, Idukki district (Note: Alencheril identifies Turubule with Chungam.)	Carneiro	Sebastiani (Note: Giuncotti. Sebastiani documents that it is an alternative name for Turgolin.); Raulin (Note: Giuucotti.); Duperron (Note: Jongam. Anquetil-Duperron states that this church is dedicated to St. Michael and belongs to the 'Syrian Catholics'.); Paulinus (Note: Ciungatta. Paulinus states that this church is dedicated to St. Michael.)
Marubuli	Kingdom of Turubule	Our Lady			Muthalakodam, Idukki district	-	Raulin (Note: Modelacort.); Duperron (Note: Modelakerte. Anquetil-Duperron documents that this church belongs to the 'Syrian Catholics'.); Paulinus (Note: Modelacodam. Paulinus documents that this church is dedicated to St. George and that the mountains of this place were full of wild elephants.)
Malucombil	Kingdom of Turubule	George the Martyr			Maylacombu, Idukki district	-	Raulin (Note: Maila Campil.); Duperron (Note: Mailacombu. Anquetil-Duperron documents that this church is dedicated to St. Thomas and belongs to the 'Syrian Catholics'.); Paulinus (Note: Mailacomba. Paulinus documents that this church is dedicated to St. Thomas.)
Cotette	Kingdom of Tecancutes	Church - 1		Cotette had two parish churches. Here Menesis forced a sick young priest to abandon his wife.	Kottayam, Kottayam district	-	Roz (Note: Cotete. Roz states that the presence of two churches in Cotete was attributed to the quarrels between the Southists and the Northists. He further states that the 'Great church of Cotete' had Southists.); Sebastiani (Note: Cottette.); Raulin (Note: Cottete.); Duperron (Note: Anquetil-Duperron documents that this church was shared between the Syrian Catholics and the 'schismatics'.)
Cotette	Kingdom of Tecancutes	Church - 2		Cotette had two parish churches. Here Menesis forced a sick young priest to abandon his wife.	Kottayam, Kottayam district		Roz; Raulin (Note: Cottete Cheria.); Duperron (Note: Anquetil-Duperron documents that this church belonged to the 'schismatics'.)
Canharapally, Canharapilly	Kingdom of Tecancutes	Holy Virgin			Kanjirappalli, Kottayam district	-	Raulin (Note: Cauhara Palli.); Duperron (Note: Changanarapalli. The church is dedicated to St. Mary and belongs to the 'Syrian Catholics'.); Paulinus (Note: Cangnarapalli. The church is dedicated to St. Mary and is located in the mountains with connections with Madurai.)
Iratur	Kingdom of Tecancutes	George the Martyr			Aruvithura, Kottayam district	-	Raulin (Note: Idatur.); Duperron (Note: Iratur. Anquetil-Duperron states that the church is dedicated to St. Mary.); Paulinus (Note: Iratushe. Paulinus states that this church is dedicated to St. Mary and the place is a gateway for a trade route to Madurai across the Western Ghats.)
Palla	Principality of Gnamacata Caimal	Thomas the Apostle		The principality of Gnamacata Caimal in which the church belonged to were independent and confederated with the Kingdom of Tecancutes.	Pala, Kottayam district	-	Raulin (Note: Pullala.); Duperron (Note: Pala. The church dedicated to St. Thomas which belongs to the 'Syrian catholics'. It is documented to be in an arsoned state.); Paulinus (Note: Palaya. Paulinus states that the church is dedicated to St. Thomas and belongs to the Catholics. He also mentions a seminary at the place.)
Changanagere	Lands of King Perata Mutaa Iorinaram	Our Lady		Here, the king came to visit Menezes.	Changanassery, Kottayam district	-	Raulin (Note: Chonganari.); Duperron (Note: Changanacherry. Anquetil-Duperron documents that this church is dedicated to St. Mary and belongs to the 'Syrian Catholics' and that it is located in the Thekkenkur Kingdom.); Paulinus (Note: Cianganaceri. Paulinus states that this church has an oratory nearby.)
Calucate	Kingdom of Porca			At Calucate, Menezes changed the names of those who bore the name Iyo, the name 'Jesus' in the Malabar language, which was very common among the Nazranis especially of the south.	Chambakkulam, Alappuzha district	-	Sebastiani (Note: Calculate.); Raulin (Note: Calurcate); Duperron (Note: Kaloorkad. The church dedicated to 'the Nativity of St. Mary', belonging to the 'Syrian Catholics'.); Paulinus (Note: Callurcatta.)
Porca	Kingdom of Porca	Holy Cross		Porca is an important port and it used to be full of robbers and pirates. The church of the place was founded by the king of Porca as gratitude for the support given by Christians, who bore a flag printed with a cross, in a war against the 'Pepper Queen'. People from Calucate were brought to the church in Porca. It was handed over to the Jesuits but later the Nasranis took over its control.	Purakkad, Alappuzha district	-	Raulin (Note: Porca); Duperron (Note: Porca. Anquetil-Duperron states that this church belonging to the 'Syrian Catholics' is dedicated to Holy Cross and is located in the Kingdom of Porca Schembanascheri Sourouvam.); Paulinus (Note: Porca.)
Coramallu	Kingdom of Porca			Here, Menesis notes that the Chaldean practice of Absolution was followed instead of confessions and hence he forced the priests to hear confessions. He also forced a married priest to abandon the wife. From here, Menezes initiated attempts to convert the tribesmen called Malleas to Catholicism.	Kudamaloor, Kottayam district	-	Sebastiani; Raulin (Note: Codamalur); Duperron (Note: Kudamallur. Anquetil-Duperron states that this church, belonging to the 'Syrian Catholics', is dedicated to the 'Nativity of Virgin Mary'.); Paulinus (Note: Codamalur. Paulinus says that the church is dedicated to Sts. Gervasis and Protasis, and Malekandathil regards this is due to the author's confusion with the Kothanallur Church.)
Carathnarat, Caratnara	Caranarete Nobility	Augustine of Hippo		It is one of the churches founded in Malabar by Alexis Menezes, at the end of the 16th century. Under Menezes's instructions, religious conversion among the Malleas community in the area was common	Ramapuram (Note: Malekandathil identifies Carathnarat with 'Ramapuram'.) Kottayam district	none	Raulin (Note: Romram.); Duperron (Note: Ramrat. Anquetil-Duperron says that the church is dedicated to St. Augustine and it belongs to the 'Syrian Catholics'.); Paulinus (Note: Ramaratta.)
Naranão	Lands of Charavacoil	Our Lady		Charavacoil is an independent lord of the caste of the kings of Cochin. Menezes took the journey to this plae through a broad river full of crocodiles.	Niranam, Pathanamthitta district	-	Raulin (Note: Neonaor.); Duperron (Note: Niranam. Anquetil-Duperron states that this church belonging to the 'schismatics' is dedicated to St. Mary.); Paulinus (Note: Neranatta. Paulinus documents that this church is the seat of the Jacobite bishop Mar Thoma.)
Calupare	Kingdom of Rapelim (Note: The Edappally Rajas held sovereign rights over the isolated enclave of Kallooppara.)	Thomas the Apostle		The Cassanars here did not attend the Synod of Diamper.	Kallooppara, Pathanamthitta district	-	Raulin (Note: Calur Para.); Duperron (Note: Kalloupar. Anquetil-Duperron documents that this church is dedicated to St. Mary and belongs to the 'schismatics'.); Paulinus (Note: Callupare. Paulinus states that the church is dedicated to St. Mary.)
Changanor	Kingdom of Changanor	Our Lady		Located in the lands of the Changanor Temple. Here, Menesis compelled an influential Cassanar to 'throw away' his wife and children, which he did not heed to.	Chengannur, Alappuzha district	-	Raulin (Note: Cengenor. Raulin states it belonged to the 'schismatics'.); Duperron (Note: Chengannoor. Anquetil-Duperron states that this church is dedicated to St. Mary and belongs to the 'schismatics'.); Paulinus (Note: Cenganur.)
Maruquitil	Kingdom of Changanor	Our Lady			Manarcaud, Kottayam	-	Raulin (Note: Manirgat. Raulin states that this church belongs to the 'schismatics'.); Duperron (Note: Manargata.Anquetil-Duperron states that this church, located in the Kingdom of Tekengour, is dedicated to St. Mary, belongs to the 'schismatics'.)
Maruquitil	Kingdom of Changanor	Our Lady			Maramon, Pathanamthitta district (Note: Malekandathil prefers Alencheril's identification. However he notes Maramon as an alternative identification.)	-	Raulin (Note: Moramanur.); Duperron (Note: Maramon. Anquetil-Duperron states that this church is dedicated to St. Mary and belongs to the 'schismatics'.); Paulinus (Note: Maramamil. Plotted in Paulinus' map.)
Tuumpone	Lands of Chemparanura Bil	Our Lady		Menesis went there during his visit to Maruquitil. The priests there had not attended the Synod of Diamper. Chemparanura Bil is said to be a king-like independent lord and a relative of the kings of Cochin.	Thumpamon, Pathanamthitta district	-	Raulin (Note: Tembucur. Raulin states that the church belonged to the 'schismatics'.); Duperron (Note: Thumpamon.); Paulinus (Note: Tumbonur.)
Calecoulão	Kingdom of Calecoulão	Old Church	Marxabro and Marprod the 'Nestorians' 'All Saints'	It was located in the interior of the land and was the oldest of the two churches in Calecoulão.	Kayamkulam, Alappuzha district	-	Duperron (Note: Kalicoulan. The church is dedicated to Holy Virgin and belongs to the 'schismatics'.); Paulinus (Note: Cáyamcollam. Paulinus speaks of two churches with the name Cáyamcollam. First is dedicated to Sts. Gervasi and Protasi under the churches of the 'Schismatics'. The second is listed under Latin churches under the Diocese of Cochin.)
Calecoulão	Kingdom of Calecoulão	Church - 2	Holy Virgin	This church was under the Franciscans and was included in the Diocese of Cochin. It was destroyed by the king of Calecoulão. Portuguese were not allowed to sail from Cochin to Coulão through rivers and their sea pearls were thus detained in Coulão. Here, the king visited Menezis and allowed a plot of land for the church and access of rivers for the merchants.	Kayamkulam, Alappuzha district	-	Duperron; Paulinus
Caramanate	Kingdom of Calecoulão	Holy Virgin		Here, Menezis triggered communal tensions among Nairs against Saint Thomas Christians by insulting the Nair deities and their beliefs.	Kadampanadu, Kollam district	-	Duperron (Note: Kadambanad.); Paulinus (Note: Cadambara. Paulinus states that this church is dedicated to St. Mary and belongs to the 'schismatics'.)
Corico Langare	Kingdom of Panapely	George the Martyr		St. George is also called Marbarguida. Here Menezes found a large number of books which he burnt.	Cheppad, Alappuzha district	-	Raulin (Note: Curiem Colongare.); Duperron (Note: Kojienkolangaré or Kolangouri. Anquetil-Duperron states that this church belonged to the 'schismatics'.); Paulinus (Note: Tekkencollangare or Codamcullangare. The former is used in the list while the latter is used in the map by Paulinus.)
Batimena	Kingdom of Panapely	Our Lady			Venmony, Pathanamthitta district. (Note: Malekandathil identifies Batimena with Venmony.)	-	Duperron; Paulinus
Catiapeli	Kingdom of Batimena			Here, the king of Batimena visited Menezes	Karthikappalli, Kollam district	-	Duperron (Note: Karthikappalli. Anquetil-Duperron states that the church is dedicated to St. Thomas and belongs to the 'schismatics'.); Paulinus (Note: Cartyapally. The church is dedicated to S Mary and belongs to the Jacobites.)
Mauelicare, Podiagabo	Kingdom of Marta	Holy Virgin		Since there were two bazaars nearby, Mavelikkara and Puthiyakavu, the church was known by both of them.	Mavelikkara, Alappuzha district	-	Raulin (Note: Podiacabo.); Duperron (Note: Puthiakavu. Anquetil-Duperron states that this church belonging to the 'schismatics' is dedicated to St. Mary.); Paulinus (Note: Mavalicare.)
Gundara	Kingdom of Gundara	Thomas the Apostle		It is said to be a small church lying in a clearing of a forest.	Kundara, Kollam district	-	Raulin (Note: Gundare. Raulin says that this church belongs to the'schismatics'.); Duperron (Note: Kondoura. Anquetil-Duperron documents that this church belongs to the 'schismatics' and is under the Kingdom of Kalicoulam Scherravi.); Paulinus (Note: Condùr. Paulinus says that this church is dedicated to Saint Mary and belongs to the 'schismatics'.)
Calare	Kingdom of Changanate (Coulão)	Our Lady		This church was first located in the other side of the river in the lands of King Charaua. It was relocated to its location in the Kingdom of Changanate after being destroyed by king Charaua. After the death of the King of Changanate, his territory was inherited by the King of Travancore.	Kallada, Kollam district	-	Raulin (Note: Calera.Raulin); Duperron (Note: Kallada.); Paulinus (Note: Collare or Catare. Paulinus states that this church is dedicated to St. Mary belongs to the Jacobites.)
Teualecare	Kingdom of Changanate (Coulão)			Tarisappalli Copper Plates were preserved in the church during Archbishop Menesis' visit to the place in the early 17th century. Here, Menezis was saved by the Christians from the attack of Muslims.	Thevalakkara, Kollam district	-	Raulin (Note: Tevalecare.); Duperron (Note: Thevalakkara. The church belongs to the 'schismatics'.); Paulinus (Note: Tevelacare. Paulinus states that this church is dedicated to St. Mary and that it belongs to the Jacobites.)
Coulão	Kingdom of Changanate (Coulão)	Old Church	St. Thomas the Apostle	It was founded by Marxabro and Marprod the two 'Nestorians', called saints who came from 'Babylonia' and secured great privileges from the king in Coulão 733 years ago. Due to differences with the Portuguese and wars, the Saint Thomas Christians left the church to the Portuguese and shifted to upper Coulão. The Portuguese occupied the church and started to build a fort around it. Menesis directed the completion of the fortification which had been stopped.	Kollam, Kollam district	Thiruvatikal (Note: Tarisappalli. This documentation is found in the Quilon Syrian Copper Plates of c. 849.); Polo (Note: Coilum.); Jordanus (Note: Columbum. In 1329, Jordanus documents the Nasranis' devotion to St. Thomas in his book Mirabilia Descripta.); Marignolli (Note: Columbum. In 1348, Marignolli says that he preached at a Saint George's Church, which was founded earlier in the 1320s by Friar Jordanus.); Albuquerque (Note: Coulão. In 1504, Albuquerque documents that Coulão church is dedicated to 'Our Lady of Mercy' and has three altars with two silver crosses and a golden cross. He records that it is said to be built by two saints who had previously arrived in Malabar, and that they were buried in two chapels in the church.); Empoli (Note: Colom. In 1504, Empoli documents that the church is dedicated to St. Mary and has about 3000 Christians.); Dionysii 1578 (Note: Coulão. In 1578, Dionysii documents that this church is the first to be built by the two saint brothers from Babylonia.)	Roz (Note: Coulao. Roz states that the church was built on the sea shore by Sapor and Aprot 679 years ago. He further states that church was then under the Diocese of Cochin. The Nasranis had transferred from this church to upper Coulao, where they already had a 'cross'. The bodies of the two brothers are lying in the older church over which there are slabs with writings that are neither in Malavares nor Chaldean. He also states that this church was burnt down after which it was rebuilt by the Portuguese and due to carelessness got occupied by the Diocese of Cochin.); Raulin (Note: Raulin mentions two churches namely, Color Superior and Coilor. Raulin says that the former of these belonged to the 'schismatics'.); Duperron (Note: Anquetil-Duperron states two churches namely, Koulan (or Collan) and Coulan decima. Du Perron says that the former is dedicated to St. Thomas and is under the 'schismatics' while the latter is dedicated to St. Mary and belongs to the 'Latin Catholics'.); Paulinus (Note: Collam. Paulinus says that the Church of St. Thomas belonging to the Jacobites was destroyed.)
Coulão	Kingdom of Changanate (Coulão)	Coulão de Cima	Our Lady	It was founded by the Saint Thomas Christians who shifted to interior due to Portuguese hegemony in their old church. It was located close to a fort being built by the King of Travancore.	Kollam, Kollam district		Roz; Raulin; Duperron; Paulinus
Travancore	Kingdom of Travancore			Menesis did not visit the church of Travancore personally. It is the first church to be reconstructed following the Synod of Diamper as per Portuguese norms.	Thiruvithamcode, Kanyakumari district	Menezis (Note: Travancor. Action VIII Decree VI of the Synod of Diamper. It says that the church is in completely demolished condition and that it's parishioners had become heathens due to isolation and lack of priests. Menezis appointed a vicar and ordered an immediate rebuilding of the church.)	Roz (Note: Tyrivancor. Roz states that the Christians of this place were among the three settlements of Christians who migrated out of Maliapur due to wars and famine.); Raulin (Note: Tracore.); Duperron (Note: Thiruvankotta. Anquetil-Duperron states that this church was dedicated to St. Thomas belonged to the Jacobites.); Paulinus (Note: Paulinus documents that this church was dedicated to St. Thomas and was under the Jacobites.)
Maliapore		Holy Virgin			Mylapore, Chennai district	Denha	Roz (Note: Maliapur. Roz states that the church of Maliapur is the first and most ancient of the churches of the Nasranis. Christians of this place migrated out to Malabar due to relentless wars and famine.)

== Translations ==
- A now lost undated and unpublished translation to Spanish by François Muñoz.
- de Glen, Jean-Baptiste (1609). Histoire orientale, des grans progres de l'eglise cathol. apost. & rom. en la reduction des anciens chrestiens, dits de S. Thomas, de plusieurs autres schismatiques & heretiques a l'vnion de la vraye eglise. Conuersion encor des mahometains, mores & payens (in French). Antwerp; Brussels: Hierosme Verdussen; Rutger Velpius. This is the translation of the Spanish bridge version translated by François Muñoz.
- Malekandathil, Pius (2003). Jornada of Dom Alexis de Menezes: A Portuguese Account of the Sixteenth Century Malabar. Kochi: Liturgical Research Centre..
