= Angamaly church =

Angamaly Church may refer to:

- St. George Syro-Malabar Basilica, Angamaly
- St. Mary's Jacobite Soonoro Cathedral, Angamaly
- Mar Hormizd Syro-Malabar Catholic Co-cathedral, Angamaly
