= St. George Syro-Malabar Basilica, Angamaly =

Angamaly Valiyapalli

St. George Syro-Malabar Catholic Basilica
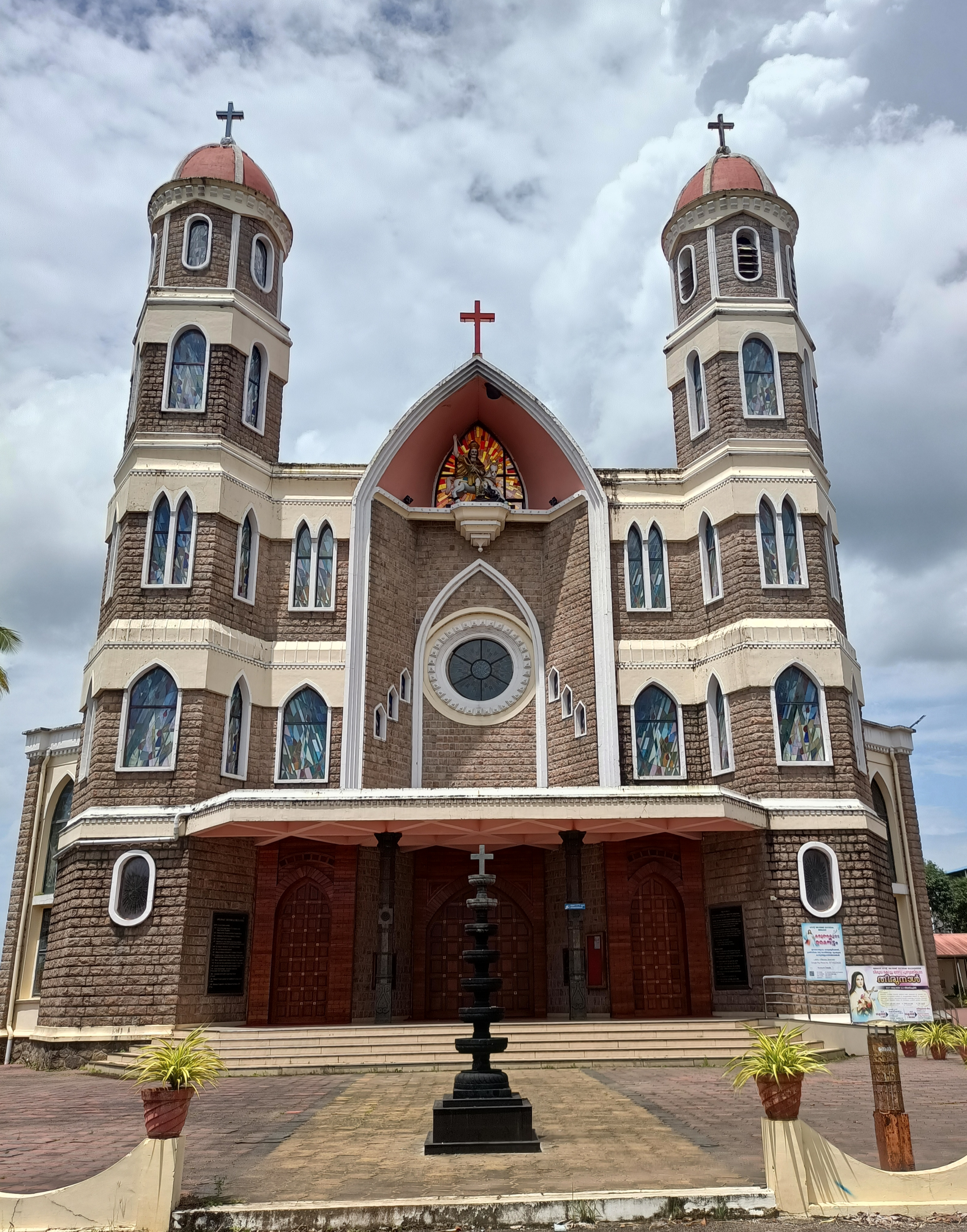
- Current structure
- St. George Syro-Malabar Catholic Basilica
- 10.1906°N 76.3828°E
- Location: Angamaly, Kerala
- Country: India
- Denomination: Syro-Malabar Church

History
- Former name: Angamaly Valiyapalli
- Status: minor basilica
- Dedication: St. George
- Dedicated: New church blessed on 31 December 2006
- Earlier dedication: St. Mary, Mother of Light and Life
- Consecrated: 450

Architecture
- Functional status: Usual
- Demolished: ancient church demolished in 2006

Administration
- District: Ernakulam
- Archdiocese: Ernakulam-Angamaly

Clergy
- Archbishop: Raphael Thattil
- Rector: Jimmy Poochakkattu
- Vicar: Jimmy Poochakkattu

St. George Syro-Malabar Catholic Basilica is a basilica of the Syro-Malabar Catholic Church situated in Angamaly, Kerala, India. On 24 June 2009, Pope Benedict XVI raised St George Forane Church to the status of minor basilica. Together with an underground parish hall where wedding gatherings are commonly held, it covers about 24,000 sq ft (2,200 m^{2}).

== History ==
=== Angamaly's three churches ===
Christianity in Angamaly traces its origin to the Christian settlement in the Chera Perumal capital Makothevarpattanam in present day Kodungallur. Following the fall of Christian Kodungallur, Angamaly became the foremost and most influential among the Saint Thomas Christian settlements, a fact that is apparent from the presence of three ancient churches in close vicinity. However, as noted by Melchior Carneiro, there was only one church back then in Angamali in 1550s and it was in the name of "Holy Virgin the Mother of Christ, the light and life". The newer church or Cheriapalli dedicated to St. Mary (of Assumption) was erected in 1575 by Archdeacon George of Christ as the seat of the Archdeaconate while the older church or Valiyapalli remained as the parish church for the local Christians. In 1577, Metropolitan Abraham founded the Cathedral Church of Mar Hormizd as the Archbishop's seat in the Eastern end of the Angamaly bazaar.

Antonio de Gouvea, in his book Jornada do Arcebispo de Goa Dom Frey Aleixo de Meneses (1606), the travelogue of Alexis de Menezes the padroado Archbishop of Goa who convened the Synod of Diamper, gives the following account of the churches in Angamaly:

Angamalle (Angamali) has three big churches, the Cathedral had been dedicated to Hermusio (Hormusio) Abbot, a Nestorian heretic, and very important head of this heresy; the Archbishop changed its name to Saint Hormisda, martyr of Persia, which is the same name in the Malabar language...

— Antonio de Gouvea, Jornada do Arcebispo de Goa Dom Frey Aleixo de Meneses (1606), Malekandathil 2003, p. 350

Following the Synod of Diamper and Coonan Cross Oath, the Saint Thomas Christian community underwent a schism into Syrian Catholic and Syrian Jacobite factions. Giuseppe Maria Sebastiani, the Italian Carmelite sent by the pope to reunite the dissenting Christians, describes the Valiyapalli in Angamaly as the 'People's Church', the Cheriapalli as the 'Archdeacon's Church' and the cathedral as the 'Archbishop's Church' during his second expedition to Malabar.

The churches of Angamaly were eventually partitioned between the two groups in the early Eighteenth century. Anquetil Du Perron, who visited Malabar in the eighteenth century, notes the allegiance of the three churches of Angamaly:

1. Church of the Holy Virgin (valiyapalli or Great Church) co-owned by Syrian Catholics and Jacobites. It had a chapel dedicated to Saint George in which the Jacobites used to celebrate their liturgy after that of the Catholics.
2. A church dedicated to Saint Hormisdas the Martyr, used exclusively by the Syrian Catholics. It was the Cathedral church of the diocese before its see was moved to Cranganore.
3. Another church which is also dedicated to the Holy Virgin. It is known locally as the Cheriyapally (Minor Church). It is the headquarters of Archdeacon Thoma I and it is used exclusively by the Syrian Jacobites.

He then mentions a fourth church in the country of the Velutha Thavali, which is at Akaparambu and dedicated to Saint Gervasis, co-owned by Syrian Catholics and Jacobites.

Varthamanapusthakam refers to a part of an agreement being made between the Palayakur and Puttenkur factions in the following words: ‘The Puthenkur and the Palayakur Christians of Angamali of 'Makothevarpattanathu' had agreed among themselves that the Puttenkur Christians buying half the share of the value of the Valiyappalli (the old church) of Angamali from the Palayakur would no longer raise any claim over the said Valiyapalli and that they had handed over its full and complete ownership to the Palayakur.' The remaining part of the agreement preserved by the Jacobites says that the Church of Akapparambu was handed over to the full and complete ownership of the Puttenkur.

== Patronage to St George ==
The Valiyapalli of Angamali is mentioned as dedicated to Saint Mary for the last time in Duperron's account, which also states that there existed within the church a chapel dedicated Saint George. Eventually, the Valiyapalli itself came to be called Saint George’s church. This seems to have happened before the church assembly that enacted the Angamaly Padiyola which refers to the Valiyapalli as dedicated to Saint George. Carmelite friar Paulinus in 1790s also lists the Valiyapalli as dedicated to Saint George.

== Angamaly Padiyola ==
The Valiyapalli witnessed decisive meetings of the Paḻayakūṟ Christians during the later half of the eighteenth century. One of these which met in 1787 drew up the historic Angamāly Padiyōla. It is a charter enacted by the assembly of representatives from 84 Paḻayakūṟ churches who gathered in Angamaly Valiyapalli under the leadership of Paremmakkal Thoma, the administrator of the Archdiocese of Cranganore. This historic document appeals to the pope for the consecration of a native bishop for them. It also demanded autonomy for their Church which was forcibly brought under the Latin Church's jurisdiction in 1599 through the Synod of Diamper. They also decided to approach the Chaldean Patriarchate, if their requests were turned down. Paremakkal had based his seat of archdiocesan administration from the Valiyapalli. The assembly selected twelve priests as 'canons' to assist and advise Paremmakkal in discharging his responsibilities.
