= Mar Hormizd Syro-Malabar Cathedral, Angamaly =

Angamali East Church
- Mar Hormizd Syro-Malabar Catholic Co-cathedral Church, Angamaly
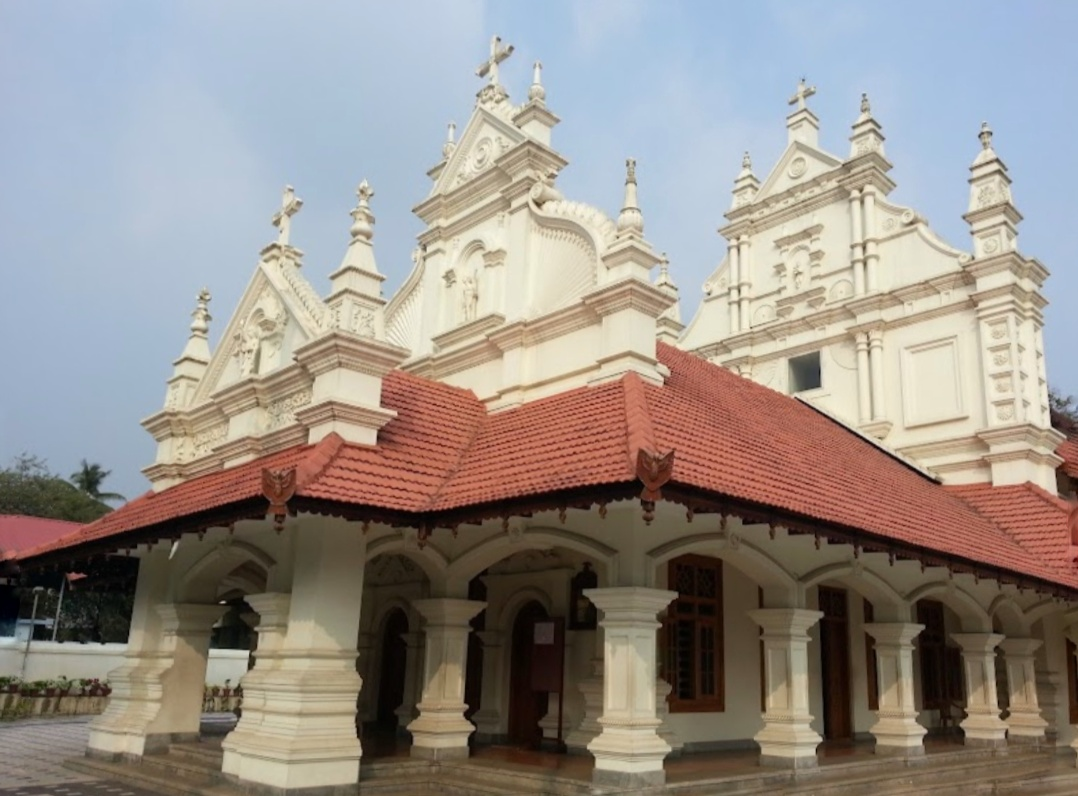
- Mar Hormizd Syro-Malabar Church, Angamaly
- Angamali East Church
- 10.188935°N 76.38836°E
- Location: Angamaly, Kerala
- Country: India
- Denomination: Catholic Church
- Sui iuris church: Syro-Malabar Church, formerly Chaldean Catholic Church
- Tradition: East Syriac Rite

History
- Former name: Mar Hormizd Metropolitan Cathedral
- Status: Filial
- Founded: 1578
- Founder: Abraham of Angamaly
- Dedication: Hormizd Rabban
- Dedicated: 1578
- Consecrated: 1578
- Events: Festival of St .Hormis and St. Sebastian

Administration
- Archdiocese: Syro-Malabar Catholic Major Archeparchy of Ernakulam-Angamaly
- Parish: St. George Syro-Malabar Basilica, Angamaly

Clergy
- Archbishop: Mar Raphael Thattil

Mar Hormizd Cathedral, locally known as the Eastern Church of Angamaly (Malayalam: അങ്കമാലി കിഴക്കേപ്പള്ളി, romanized: Angamali Kiḻakkeppaḷḷi) or the Cathedral Church (Malayalam: അരമനപള്ളി, romanized: Aramanappaḷḷi), is a Syro-Malabar church in Angamaly, India. It was built in 1578 by Mar Abraham, the last East Syriac Metropolitan to reach the Malabar Coast. It is one of the oldest and is historically the most important of the three ancient Syrian churches in Angamaly. It is dedicated to Mar Hormizd, a seventh-century East Syriac saint.

The Chaldean bishop Mar Abraham was ordained as the Archbishop of Angamali and Rabban Hormiz Church was the Cathedral church. Mar Abraham came to Malabar in 1570 as a Chaldean Catholic Archbishop after being previously imprisoned by the Portuguese in Goa. Angamaly, being a centre of Saint Thomas Christians and being an inland settlement ruled by native kings, provided a safer headquarters for the Chaldean archbishop and therefore he settled Angamaly as his episcopal see to govern the Syro-Malabar Church of India. Its jurisdiction extended all over the Indian subcontinent until the 16th century. This title denotes a quasi-patriarchal status with all India jurisdiction. The church houses the tomb of Mar Abraham who died in 1597. The most ancient school (university in Portuguese accounts) for Malpan (ecclesiastical) training was functioning at Angamaly next to the Cathedral Church, much before the arrival of the Portuguese. Following the death of Mar Abraham, the padroado Roman Catholics, led by Archbishop of Goa Alexis de Menesis, managed to block the arrival of further Syriac bishops and succeeded in organising the Synod of Diamper, a pseudo-diocesan synod, and forcibly brought the Syro-Malabar Christians under their jurisdiction. The Synod questioned the status of the cathedral, anathematized Rabban Hormizd and decreed to replace the patron saint's name and commemorations with that of Hormizd the Martyr. The church, however, retained that cathedral status until Francisco Roz moved the diocesan headquarters to Kodungallur.

== History ==
=== Mar Hormizd Church, the Metropolitan Church ===
After having made a successful escape from the Portuguese detention in Goa, Mar Abraham returned to Angamaly in 1570. In the same year, Mar Abraham started to construct his Cathedral Church in patronage of Rabban Hormizd, a seventh-century Abbot of the East Syriac Church, as its patron.

In 1578, as a response to the requests made on the part of the Jesuit missionaries who had been working in Angamaly and in the other centres of the Christians of St. Thomas, the pope sent plenary indulgences to the Cathedral of Rabban Hormizd which the faithful could obtain four times a year for 25 years from the year of the election of the Metropolitan Mar Abraham. The indulgences covered two feasts of the Patron Rabban Hormizd that fell on the fifteenth day after Easter (Monday) and on the first of September. As requested by Mar Abraham, the Jesuits laid the foundation stone of a new Cathedral Rabban Hormizd in the same place that was chosen by the Metropolitan.

=== Accounts by some authors ===
Antonio de Gouvea, in his book Jornada do Arcebispo de Goa Dom Frey Aleixo de Meneses (1606), the travelogue of Alexis de Menezes the padroado Archbishop of Goa who convened the Synod of Diamper, gives an account of the churches in Angamaly:

Angamalle (Angamali) has three big churches, the Cathedral had been dedicated to Hermusio (Hormusio) Abbot, a Nestorian heretic, and very important head of this heresy; the Archbishop changed its name to Saint Hormisda, martyr of Persia, which is the same name in the Malabar language, and persuaded the people that that was the Patron Saint of that church, that they were mistaken about the day and the legend of his life, and he ordered the burning of the book on the life of the said Hormusio, for having many errors and heresies, which he first showed to all the Cassanars, which they confessed to be so.

— Antonio de Gouvea, Jornada do Arcebispo de Goa Dom Frey Aleixo de Meneses (1606), Malekandathil 2003, p. 350

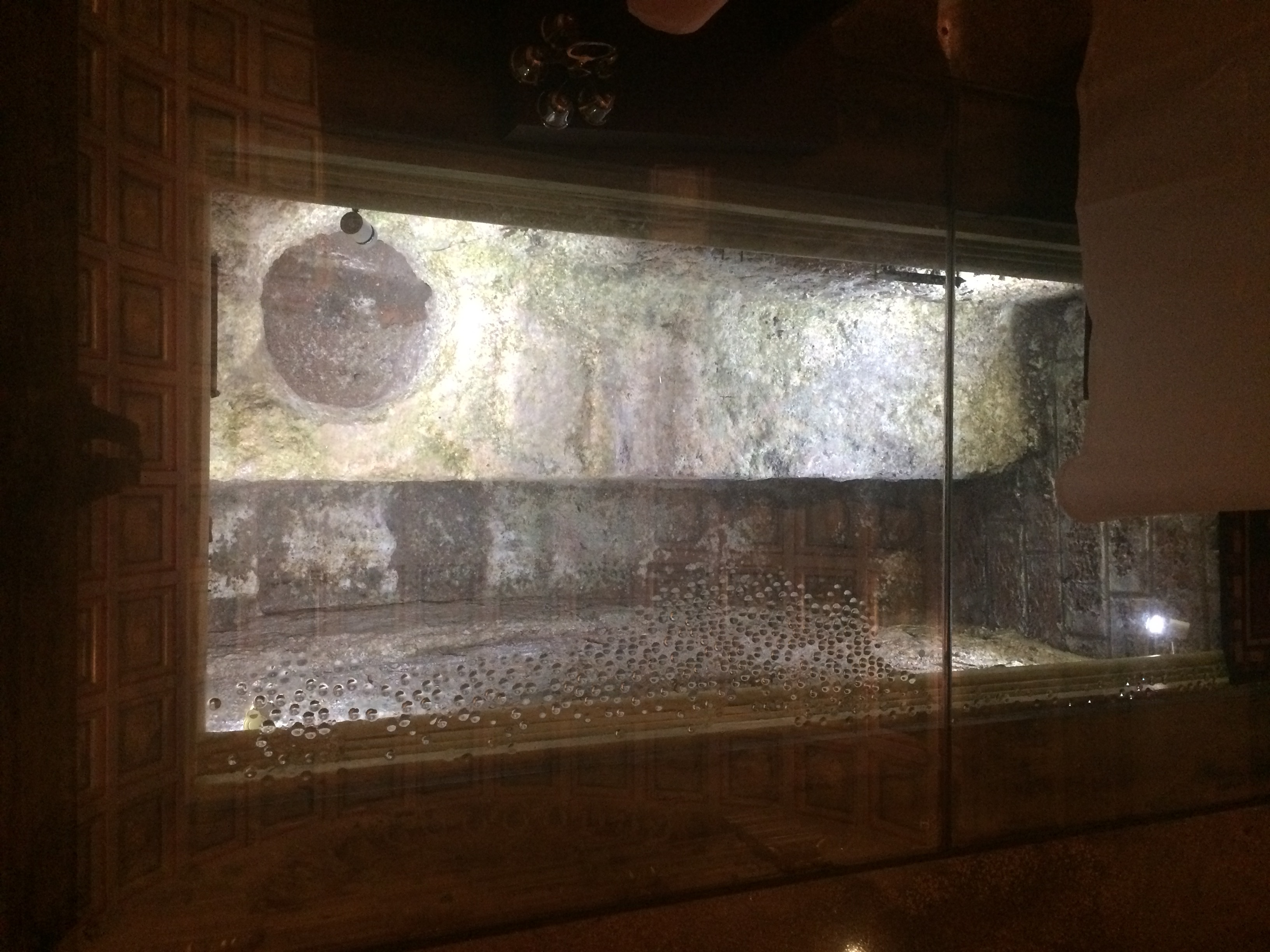
Tomb of Mar Abraham inside the Madbaha of Mar Hormizd Church, Angamaly

Anquetil Du Perron, who visited Malabar in the eighteenth century, gives the following list and description of churches in Angamaly in the country of the Velutha Thavali ruler:

1. Church of the Holy Virgin (valiyapalli or Great Church) co-owned by Syrian Catholics and schismatics (the present St George Syro-Malabar Catholic Basilica). It has a chapel dedicated to Saint George (now defunct) in which both Syrian Catholics and schismatics celebrate their liturgies one after the other.
2. Another church dedicated to Saint Hormisdas the Martyr. It is used exclusively by the Syrian Catholics. It was the Cathedral church of the diocese before its see was moved to Cranganore.
3. Another church which is also dedicated to the Holy Virgin. It is known locally as the Cheriyapally (Minor Church). It is the headquarters of Archdeacon Thoma I and it is used exclusively by the schismatics. It is the present day St. Mary's Jacobite Church.

He then mentions a fourth church in the country of the Velutha Thavali, which is at Akaparambu and dedicated to Saint Gervasis, co-owned by Syrian Catholics and schismatics. Now the original church in Akaparambu went to the Jacobites while the Syro-Malabar Catholics constructed their own church in the property allotted to them. Meanwhile the Great Church of Angamaly became exclusive to the Catholics and the Jacobites received the Minor Church of Angamaly.

== Gallery ==
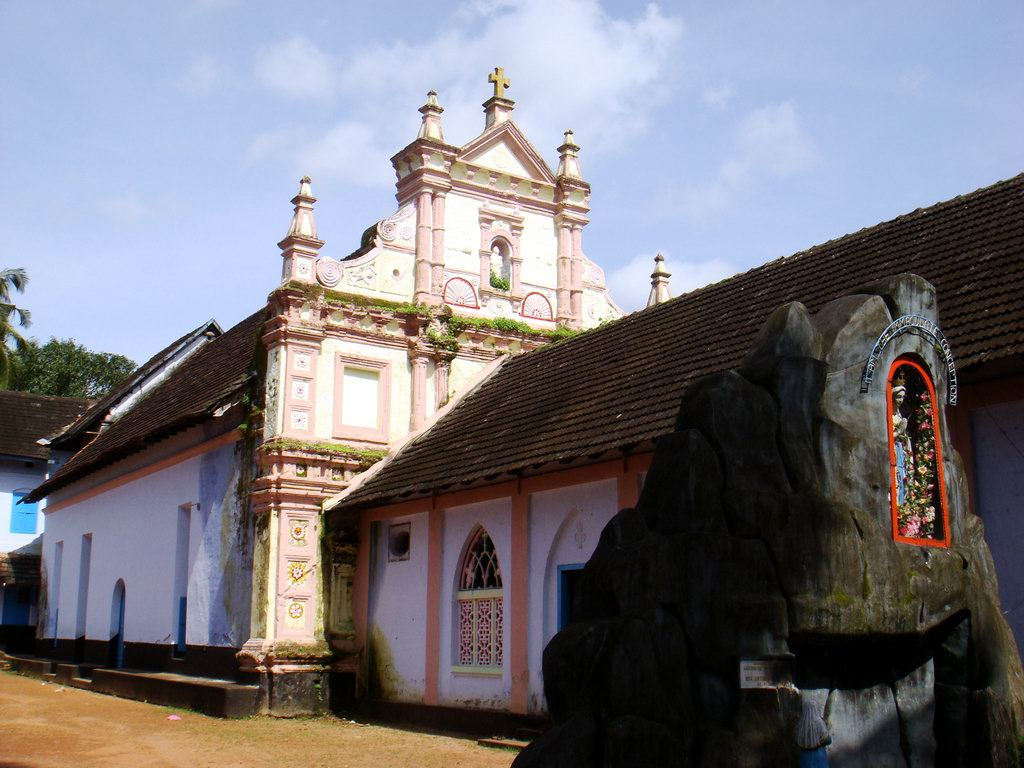
Exterior of the church

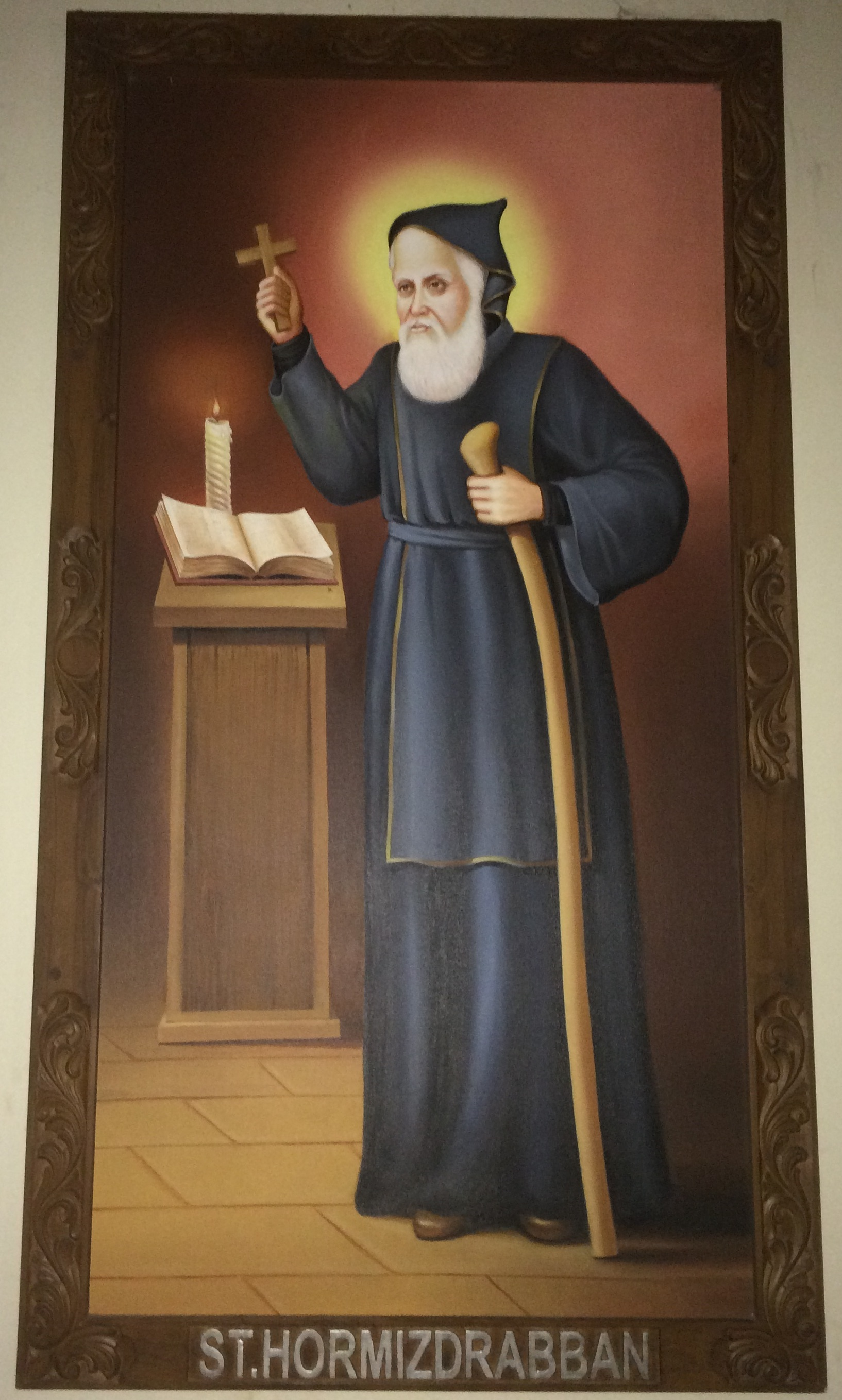
Image of Rabban Hormizd at Mar Hormizd Syro-Malabar Church, Angamaly

== See also ==
- St. George Syro-Malabar Catholic Basilica, Angamaly
- Kottakkavu Mar Thoma Syro-Malabar Pilgrim Church, North Paravur
- India (ecclesiastical province)

== Sources ==
- Malekandathil, Pius, ed. (2003). Jornada of Alexis Menesis. London: L. R. C. Publications. ISBN 9788188979004.
- Pearson, Hugh (1819). Memoirs of the Life and Writings of the Rev. Claudius Buchanan. London: Oxford University Press. pp. 85–89. OCLC 1048815028.
- Ayyar, A. S. Ramanatha (1931). Travancore Archaeological Series. Vol. VII: part 2. Superintendent of Government Press. pp. 152–155.
- Malekandathil, Pius (2020). "Angamali And The St. Thomas Christians: An Historical Overview".
- Jenee Peter. "Medieval Structural Remains from St. Hormis Church, Angamaly".
