= Karthikappalli =

- Village
- Location in Kerala, India Karthikappalli (India)
- Coordinates: 11.649637°N 75.611984°E
- Country: India
- State: Kerala
- District: Kozhikode

Languages
  - Official: Malayalam, English
- Time zone: UTC+5:30 (IST)
- PIN: 673542
- Telephone code: 0496
- Vehicle registration: KL 18
- Nearest city: Vatakara
- Lok Sabha constituency: Vatakara

Karthikappalli is a small village in Kozhikode district in the state of Kerala, India.

The population was about 19,021 people according to the 2011 Census of India. The area is about 8.7 square kilometers and has a tropical monsoon climate.
