= St. Thomas Jacobite Syrian Church, North Paravur =

Saint Thomas Jacobite Syrian church, North Paravur
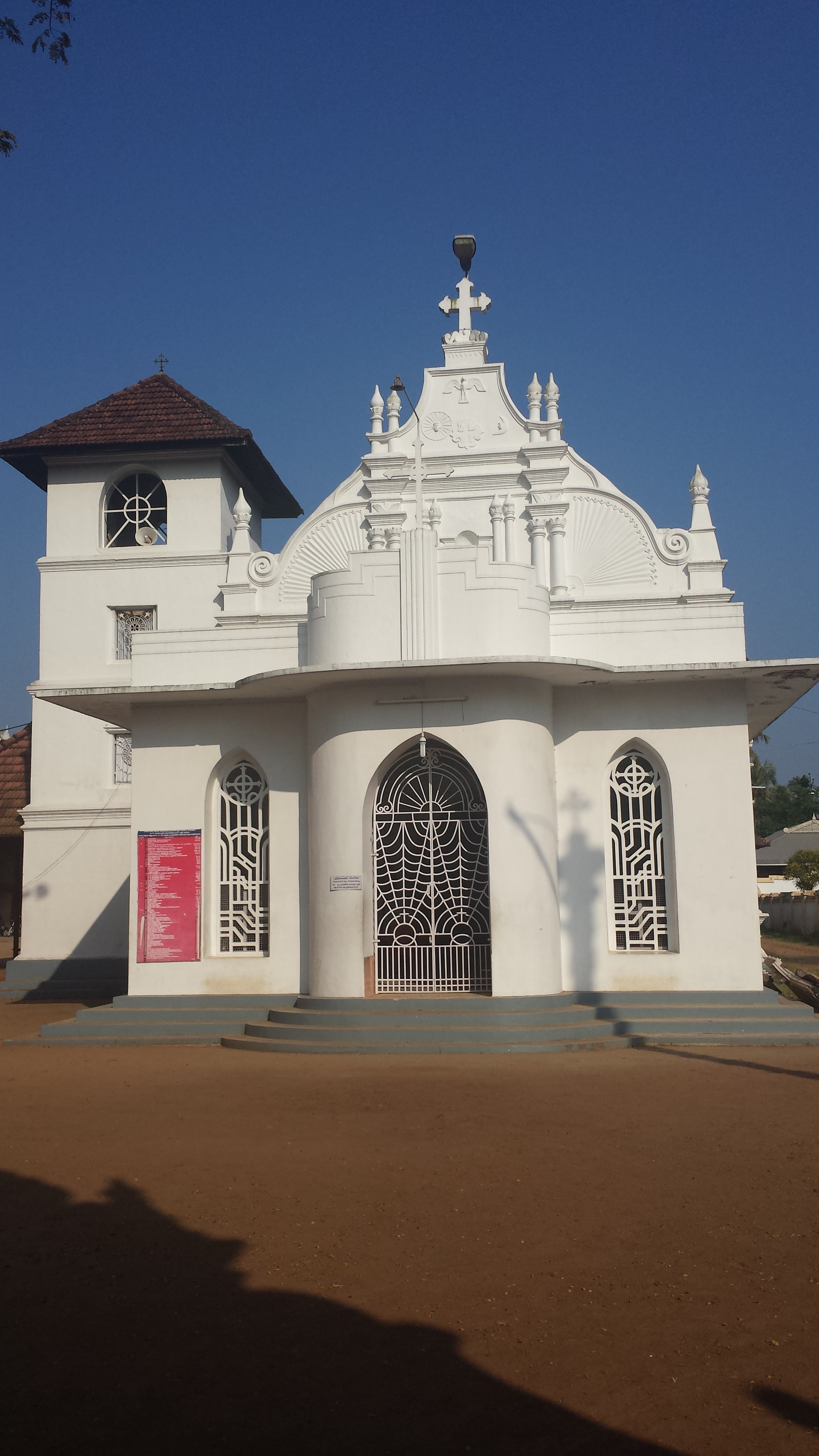
- Saint Thomas Jacobite Syrian church, North Paravur

- Click on the map to see marker

Religion
- Affiliation: Jacobite Syrian Orthodox Church
- District: Ernakulam
- Province: Kerala
- Festival: Memorial feast of Gregorios Abdul Jaleel
- Ecclesiastical or organizational status: Cathedral
- Year consecrated: 1566 by Mar Joseph Metropolitan

Location
- Location: North Paravur, Ernakulam, India
- Interactive map of Saint Thomas Jacobite Syrian church, North Paravur
- Coordinates: 10°09′03″N 76°13′22″E

Architecture
- Type: Church
- Style: Kerala Architecture
- Founder: Paravur Tharakans
- Established: 29 November 1566
- Completed: 1566
- Direction of façade: West

Saint Thomas Jacobite Syrian church, also known as Paravur Cheriyapally, is a Syrian Orthodox church located in North Paravur, India. This church was constructed in AD 1566 in the midst of the seven bazaars of Paravur town by the parishioners of the ancient Kottakkavu Paravur Valiapally. The church houses the tomb of famous Syrian Orthodox prelate Gregorios Abdul Jaleel and has staged consecrations of various prelates of the Jacobite Syrian Church since then.

== History and establishment ==
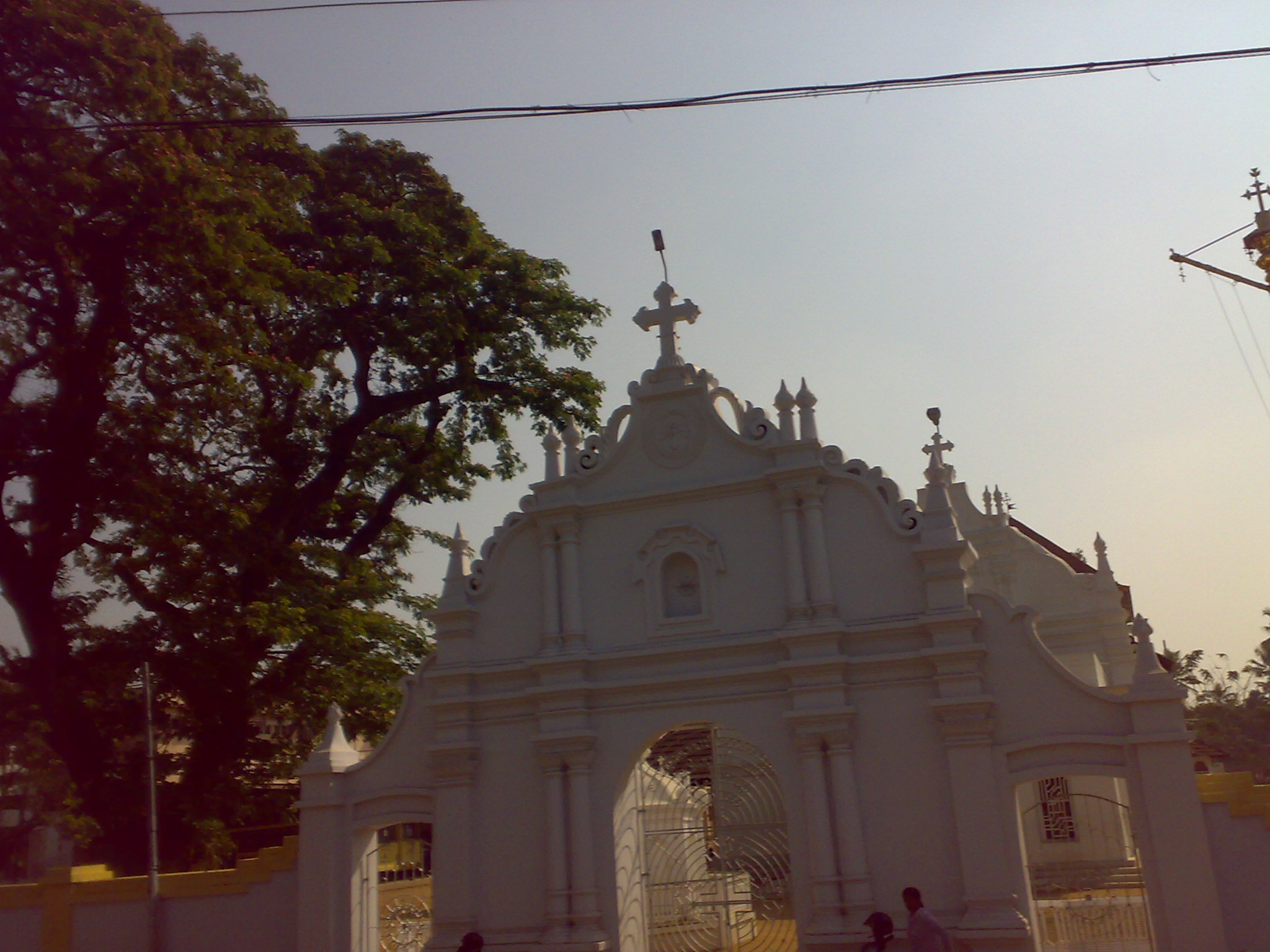
Entrance

=== Tradition of Saint Thomas ===
According to the traditions of the Saint Thomas Christians, Saint Thomas the Apostle arrived in Muziris port in Malabar in AD 52 and established seven churches which are known as Elarappallikal. One of these is at Kottakkavu that is modern North Paravur. Kottakkavu is located south of the ancient port of Muziris.

=== Establishment of the Church ===
The St. Thomas Syrian Church (Cheriapally) at Pararvur, was constructed in the new market of North Paravur in AD 1566 by the parishioners of the old Kottakkavu Church located nearby. The Big Bazar Tharakans, who were the wealthy local merchants in Paravur, led the construction of the new church. The local Ruler of Paravur exempted the church from taxes and donated a plot of land in the midst of the seven markets of New Paravur Town. The establishment of the church has been inscribed in an old granite plaque and embedded in the wall near the front door of the church.

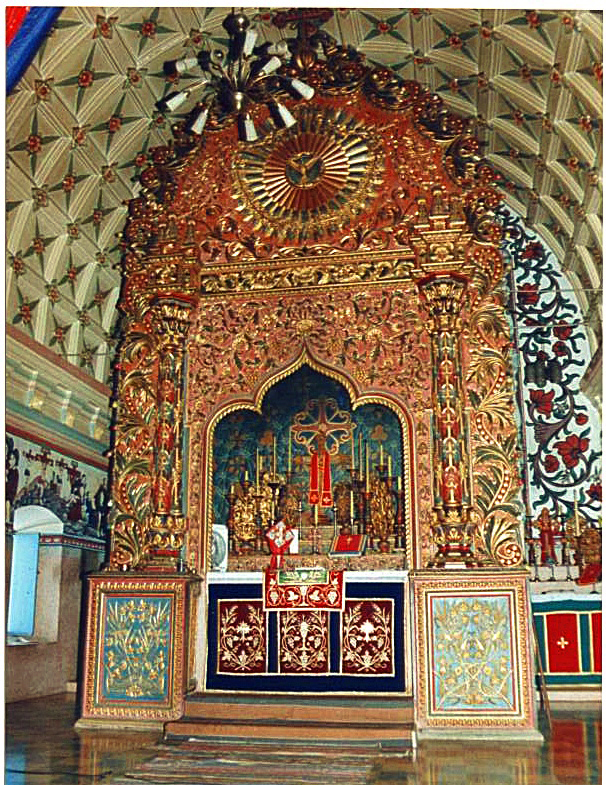
Madbaho

=== Inscription on the Granite plaque ===
"On the 16th day of the month of Vrischika in the year 1566 of the birth of the Messiah, Mar Youvseppu {Joseph} Metran, the Pattakar {priests} of many other places and the members of the Inannar (inangar) {congregation} , having assembled for the purpose of building the Mar Thommapalli {St. Thomas Church} at Pattamanal-Paravur {North Paravur}, erected the <stone> cross and conducted mass on the 16th of the month of Vrischika in the Kollam year 742"

== Gregorios Abdul Jaleel ==
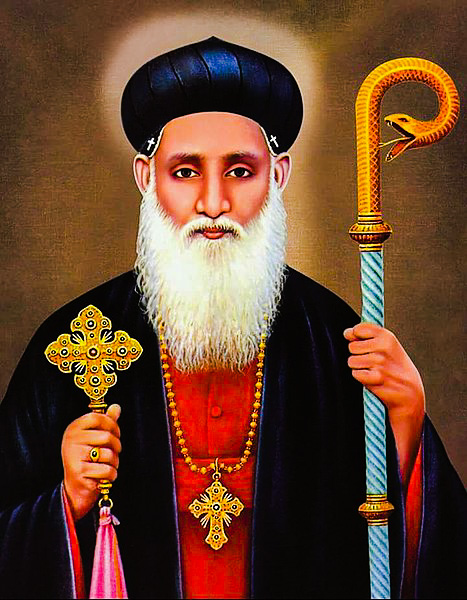

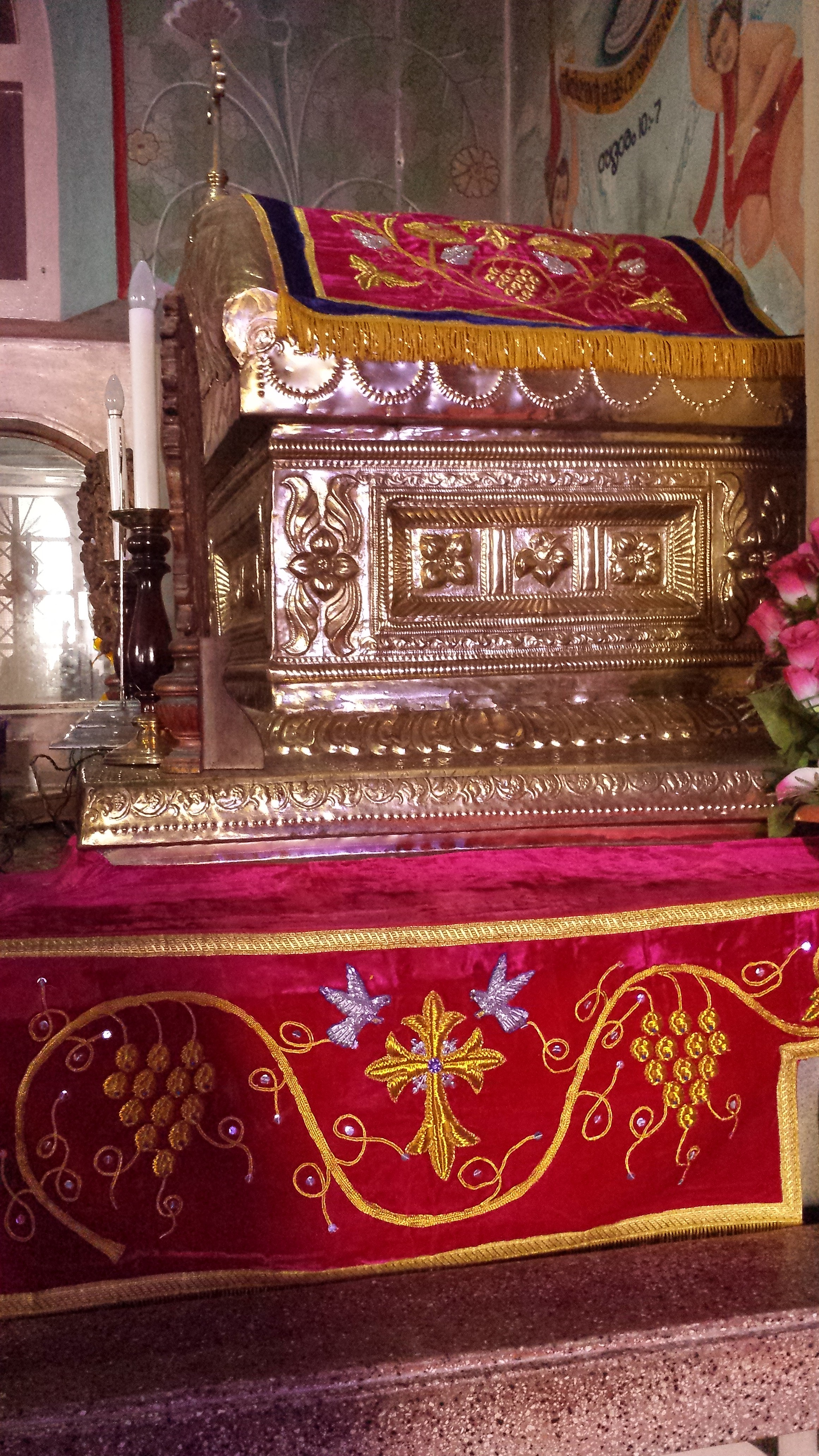
Tomb of Gregorios Abdul Jaleel

Abdal Jaleel was born in Mosul, Iraq. In 1653 he was ordained metropolitan bishop for the Ameed (Diyarbakir) diocese in Turkey by the Patriarch Ignatius She'mun. In 1664, he was elevated as the Metropolitan of Jerusalem with the title Gregorios. He traveled to India in 1665 to the ordination of Thoma I, archdeacon of the Malankara Nasrani community. He was the delegate of the Patriarch Ignatius Abdulmasih I of the Syriac Orthodox Church to Kerala Syrian Christians. He died in India in 1681, and his remains are interred in the St. Thomas Church at North Paravur. On 4 April 2000, Patriarch Ignatius Zakka I declared Mar Gregorios Abdal Jaleel a saint.
