= Kulasekharamangalam =

Kulasekharamangalam K.S.Mangalam
- village
- Location in Kerala, India Kulasekharamangalam (India)
- Coordinates: 9°47′0″N 76°25′0″E
- Country: India
- State: Kerala
- District: Kottayam

Population (2011)
  - Total: 21,728

Languages
  - Official: Malayalam, English
- Time zone: UTC+5:30 (IST)
- PIN: 686608
- Telephone code: 04829
- Vehicle registration: KL-36
- Nearest city: Vaikom
- Lok Sabha constituency: Kottayam
- Vidhan Sabha constituency: Vaikom

Kulasekharamangalam is a village in Kottayam district in the state of Kerala, India.

== Demographics ==
As of 2011 India census, Kulasekharamangalam had a population of 21728 with 10612 males and 11116 females.
