= Hormizd the Martyr =

Hormizd, the Martyr
- Born: c. 470; Persia
- Venerated in: Church of the East; Chaldean Catholic Church
- Major shrine: St. Hormiz Syro-Malabar Catholic Church Angamaly
- Feast: August 08

Hormizd, the Persian Martyr is a Church of the East saint of the fifth century (c. 420). A martyrdom act covering the history of the life and martyrdom of Hormizd the Persian was written by Theodoret, in his Historia Ecclesiastica.

The 1583 version of the Roman Martyrology included the name of St. Hormizd, the martyr, fixing his feast on the 8th of August. Since then he has been revered as a saint in the Catholic Church. An English version of the Roman Martyrology was published in 1907, entering the name of the saint as "In Persia, St. Hormisdas, a martyr," under 8 August. Whether, the Christians of St. Thomas accepted it or not, the Synod of Diamper strategically substituted the Rabban Hormizd with the name of Hormizd, the martyr in 1599 in order to assure that the Christians "are saved" from every Nestorian influence. However, as a turn of history, Rabban Hormizd himself is presently a saint of the Chaldean Catholic Church.

== Introduction ==
The persecution of Christians was carried on by the Persian emperor Bahram V and Hormizd was one of the most illustrious victims of his tyranny and malice. Hormisdas being the chief nobility among the Persians, son to the governor of a province (Marzban), and of the race of the Achemenides retained his faith in Christ in the midst of the strong provocations that he experienced from the emperor.

== Early life ==
Hormizd lived in a time when the Persian kings systematically persecuted Christians. According to Theodoret, it was not easy to express in words how the Christians were put to death. Nevertheless, these cruelties did not discourage the Christians from retaining their faith. Hormizd grew up in such a context in which he inculcated a spirit of martyrdom. According to Christelle Jullien, some martyrdoms during the reign of Bahram V, are known from literary traditions, "like that of Hormozd, Šahin, Persian notables, and Benjamin the deacon, whose story was reported by Theodoret (Eccl. Hist. V.39, 12-24; cf. Michael the Syrian, Chronicle VIII, 4, 15; 17) also preserved in an Armenian document (BHO 7; Peeters, 1909, pp. 399-415."

== His martyrdom for Christian faith ==
The positions of high status were lost to Hormisdas/Hormizd because of his strict allegiance to Christianity. His responsibilities were taken away from him and he was given a job of taking care of the camels of royal force. After a long time of humiliation he was called by the emperor who asked him to give up his faith by offering him new favours. Hormizd not only refused them but also reacted by tearing off his new dress offered by the king.

== Hormizd the Persian as Catholic saint ==
Once he expressed his unbreakable faith in Christ, he was taken to face more challenges. Once martyred, his name was officially accepted by the Roman Martyrology, published in 1583 in Rome and the Persian was revered as a Catholic saint.

== The Synod of Diamper and Hormizd ==
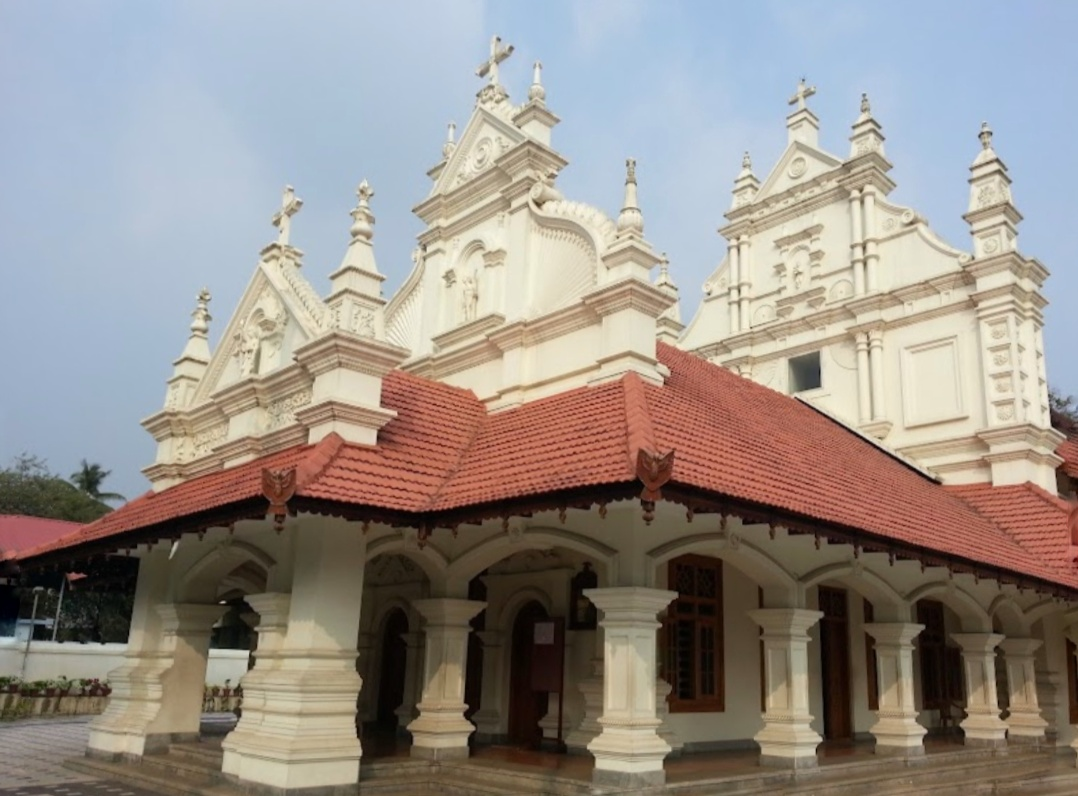
Mar Hormizd Cathedral, Angamaly

Hormizd became the patron of one of the Saint Thomas Christian churches in India, namely Mar Hormizd Church which belonged to the Syro-Malabar Church at Angamaly in Kerala. The relationship could easily be understood in connection with the 16th century Padroado mission in Malabar, where the missionaries tried to Latinise the rites and liturgy of the ancient Christians of St. Thomas through the Synod of Diamper. After the promulgation of the canons of the Synod, Rabban Hormizd, a seventh century saint of the Church of the East, was no more the patron of the St. Hormizd Church, the once Cathedral of the late Archbishop Abraham of Angamaly. The Synod of Diamper prohibited the Christians from commemorating the feast of Rabban Hormizd, since Hormizd was considered a Nestorian heretic by Latin missionaries. According to the new regulations, the Synod commanded as planned by Archbishop Aleixo de Menezes that the Christians celebrate the feast of St. Hormizd, the Martyr (according to the Roman Martyrology published from Rome in 1583), a Persian Catholic saint who lived in the fifth century, suppressing the memory of Rabban Hormizd. The Feast was fixed on the 8th of August according to the Canon 10 of the Session 2 of the Synod of Diamper.
