= Pius Malekandathil =

Indian historian, priest and professor (born 1960)

Fr. Dr. Pius Malekandathil
- Education: Kerala University; Pondicherry Central University (M.Phil. and PhD); Faculdade das Letras, Universidade de Lisboa (Portuguese language); Universidade Nova de Lisboa, (Portuguese Paleography); Heidelberg University
- Occupations: Author; Professor; Scholar; historian

Pius Malekandathil (born 1960) is an Indian historian and a priest of the Syro-Malabar Church. He is currently the Protosyncellus of the Eparchy of Kothamangalam. He is a retired professor at the Centre for Historical Studies, Jawaharlal Nehru University, New Delhi.

He is a leading expert in medieval history of India and the Saint Thomas Christians of Kerala.

== Selected publications ==
His major works include:

- The Germans, the Portuguese and India (1999)
- Portuguese Cochin and the Maritime Trade of India, 1500-1663 (2001)
- Jornada of Dom Alexis de Menezes: A Portuguese Account of the Sixteenth Century Malabar (Antonio de Gouvea, translated and edited 2003)
- Maritime India: Trade, Religion and Polity, the Indian Ocean (2010);
- The Mughals, the Portuguese and the Indian Ocean: Changing Imageries of Maritime India (2013);
- Cities in Medieval India (co-edited with Yogesh Sharma, 2014).
- Christianity in Indian History: Issues of Culture, Power, and Knowledge. (co-edited with Joy L.K. Pachuau, and Tanika Sarkar, 2016)
- Varadarajan, Lotika; Farooqui, Amar, eds. (2019). India, the Portuguese and maritime interactions.
