= Rabban Hormizd =

Persian saint

Mar Hormizd
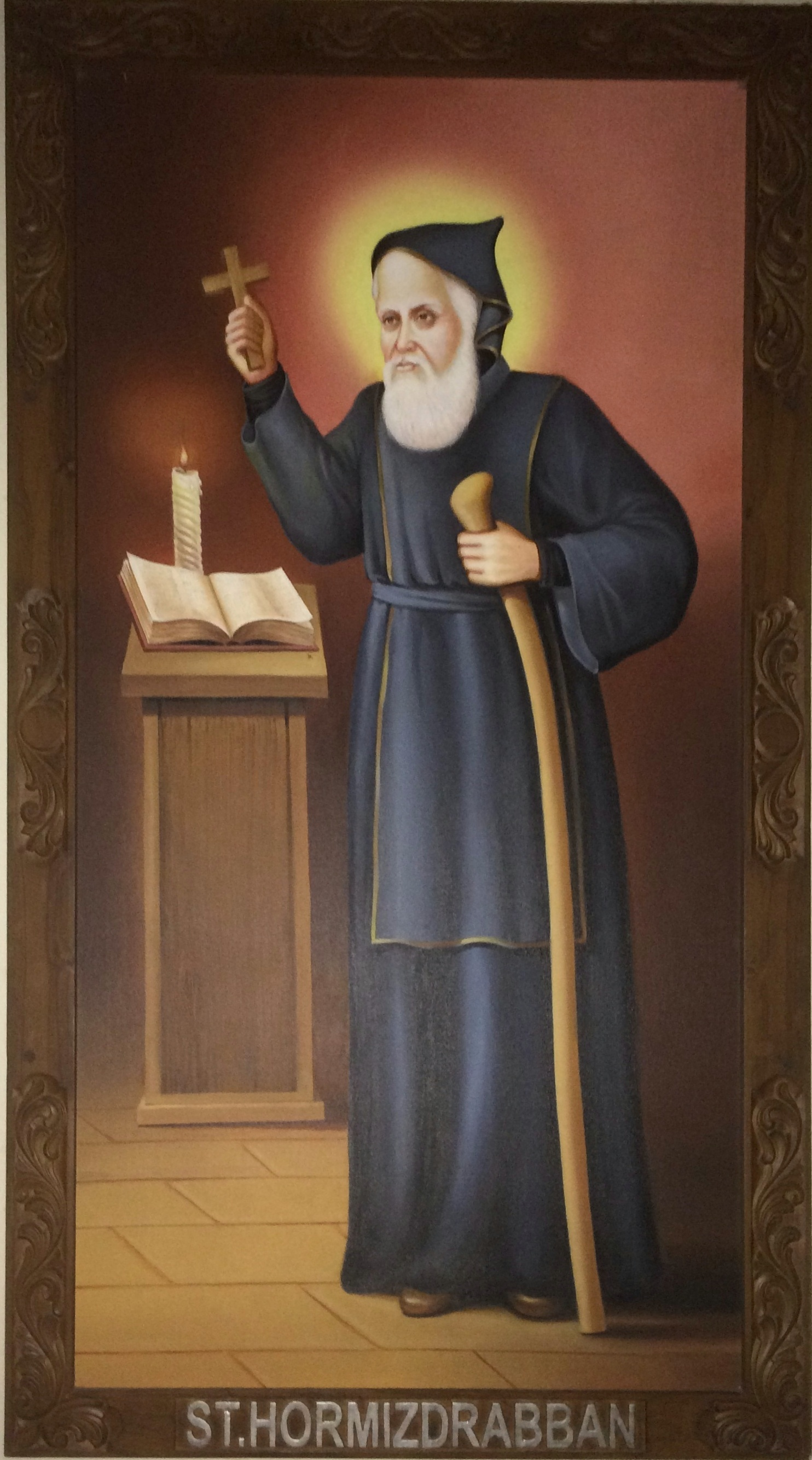
- Image of Mar Hormizd Rabban at Mar Hormizd Syro-Malabar Cathedral, Angamaly

Rabban
- Born: 6th or early 7th century Beth Lapat, Persia
- Died: mid 7th century Rabban Hormizd Monastery, modern day Iraq
- Venerated in: Assyrian Church of the East, Ancient Church of the East, Chaldean Catholic Church, Syro-Malabar Catholic Church
- Feast: 2nd Sunday after Easter

Rabban Mar Hormizd (Classical Syriac: ܕܪܒܢ ܗܘܪܡܙܕ) was a monk who lived in the seventh century in modern northern Iraq. Rabban is the Syriac term for monk. "Rabban" is also the Aramaic word for "teacher". He founded the Rabban Hormizd Monastery in Alqosh, named after him, which has served in the past as the patriarchate of the Church of the East.

In the Church of the East and its descendant branches, Rabban Hormizd is commemorated on the second Sunday after Easter.

== Life ==
According to The histories of Rabban Hormizd the Persian and Rabban Bar-Idta, a text written by his disciple Simon before the 12th century, Hormizd was born at the end of the sixth or beginning the seventh century at Beth Lapat from a rich or noble family, and at the age of eighteen he started to travel towards Scetes to become a monk there. On the way he met three monks of the Church of the East monastery of Bar Idta who urged him to become an inmate of their monastery, and he did so. He lived a hard, stern life. Hormizd lived in and near the Monastery of Bar Idta for thirty-nine years and in the monastery of Abba Abraham of Risha for six or seven years.

When Hormizd was sixty-five or sixty-six, he left the monastery and passing out of the country of Marga went and settled down in the mountain of Beth 'Edhrai near the town of Alqosh. When he had been there some little time the people in the neighbourhood offered to build him a monastery, the present Rabban Hormizd Monastery. The following part of the life of Rabban Hormizd is marked by episodes in which the he opposed the miaphysite monks of the Mar Mattai Monastery, which housed the Catholicate of the Syriac Orthodox Church in Persia.

== Gallery ==
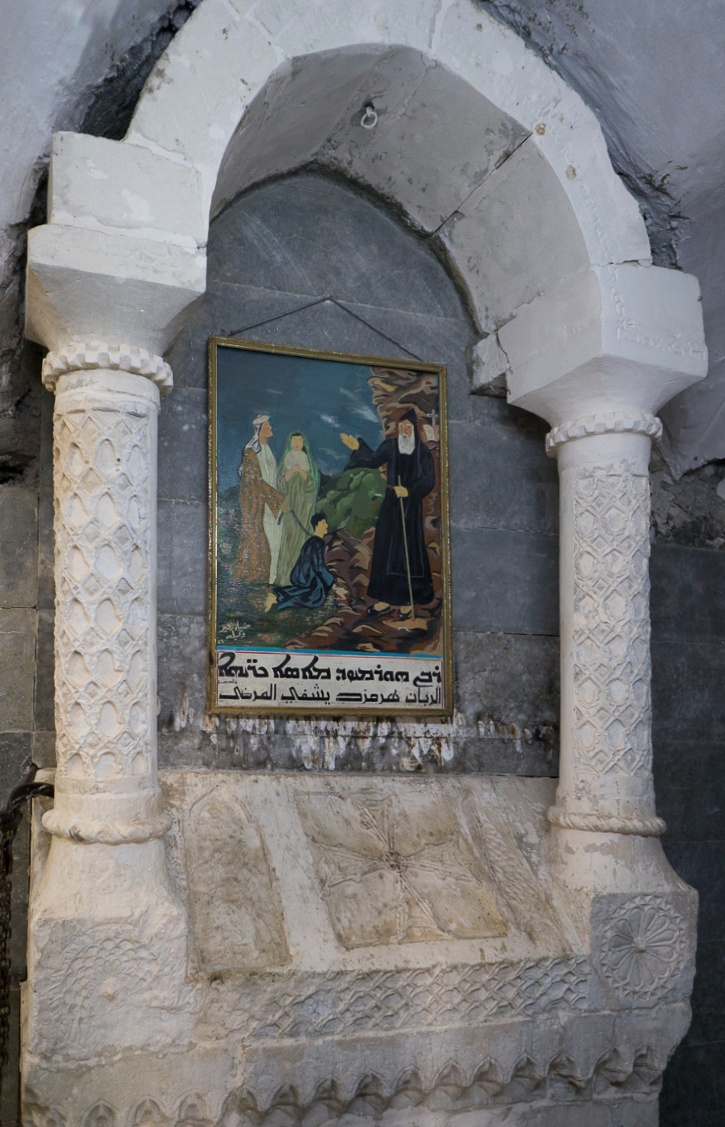
Tomb of Mar Hormizd in Rabban Hormizd Monastery.

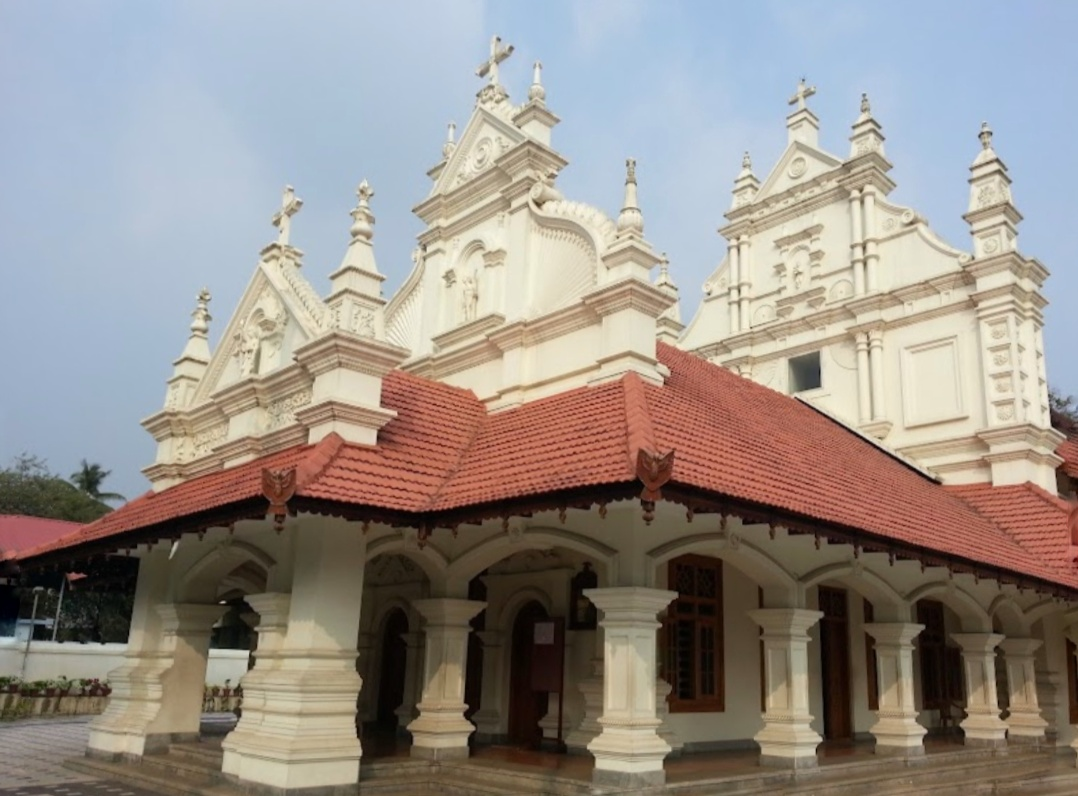
Mar Hormizd Syro-Malabar Cathedral, Angamaly, built by Mar Abraham, Metropolitan and Gate of All India.

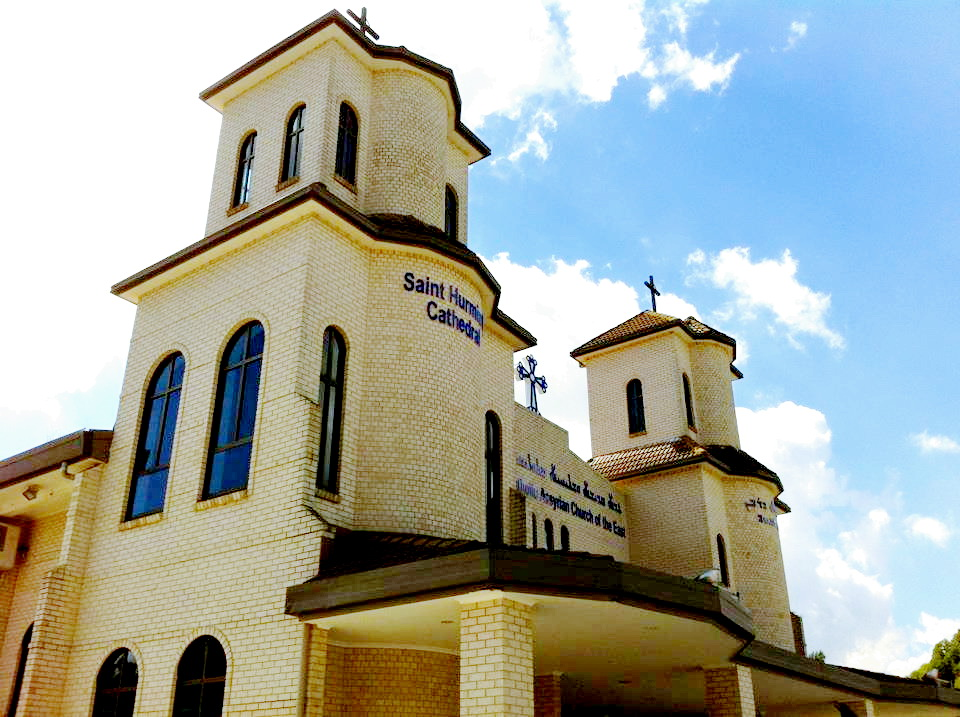
The largest Assyrian church in Australia, St Hurmizd Cathedral in Greenfield Park named after Hormizd.

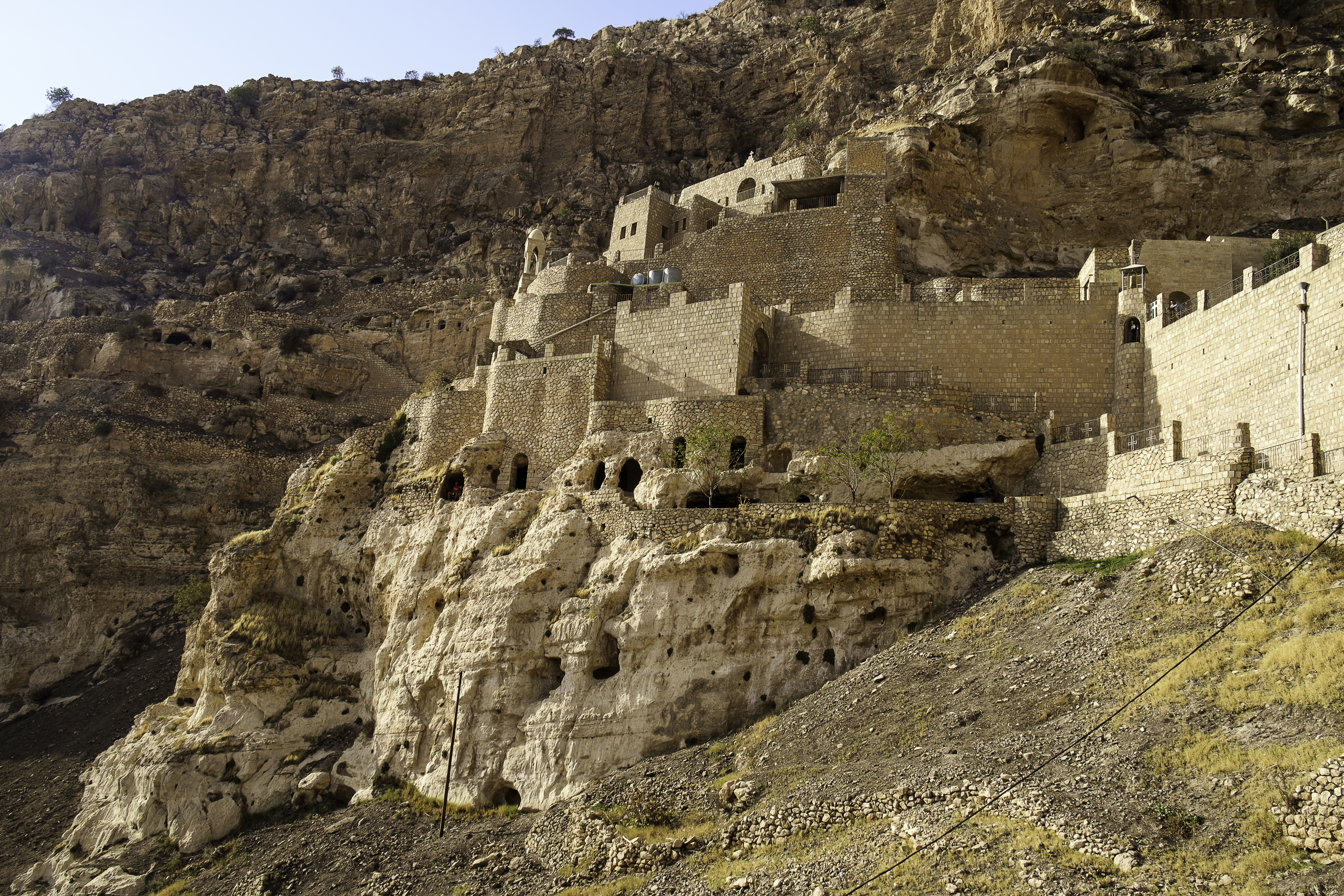
Rabban Hormizd Monastery: is an important monastery of the Chaldean Catholic Church and the Church of the East in Alqosh, Iraq.

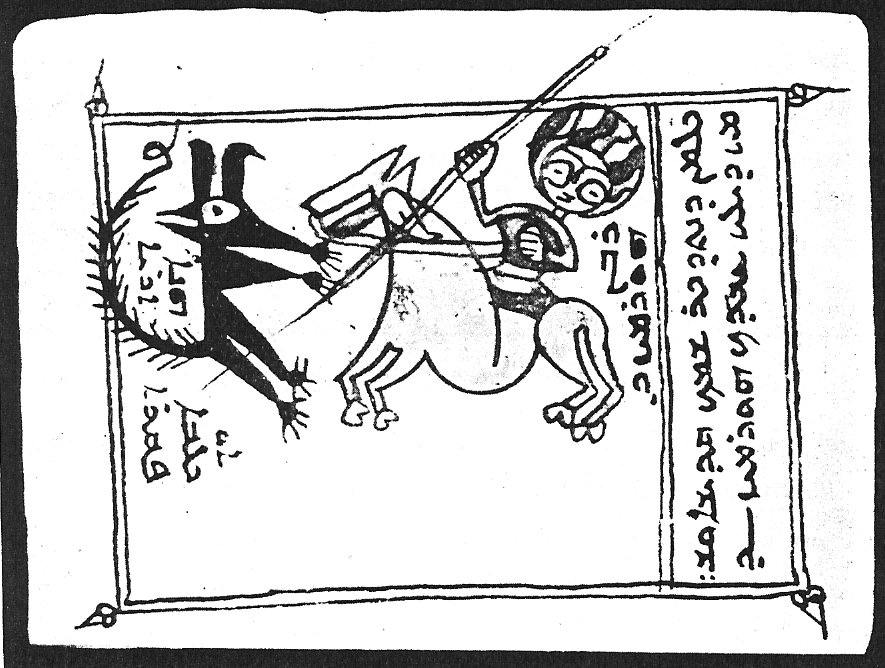
Mar Hormizd Rabban as depicted in The Book of Protection.
