= Antonio de Gouvea =

Portuguese diplomat

Most Reverend Antonio de Gouvea
- Titular Bishop of Cyrene
- Church: Catholic Church
- Previous post: Bishop of Ciudad Rodrigo (1623–1624)

Orders
- Consecration: 8 January 1612 by Alexeu de Jesu de Meneses

Personal details
- Born: 1575 Beja, Portugal
- Died: 18 August 1628 (age 53)

Antonio de Gouvea, O.E.S.A. (1575 – 18 August 1628) was a diplomat in the service of Habsburg Spain, who served as ambassador (envoy) to Safavid Iran between 1602 and 1613. An Augustinian Portuguese missionary by origin, during his service as diplomat he was appointed as Titular Bishop of Cyrene (1611–1628) and as Apostolic vicar of the Armenians of the Safavid royal capital of Isfahan. He was succeeded as ambassador to the Safavid Empire by García de Silva Figueroa.

During his service as diplomat, De Gouvea also wrote two books on Safavid Iran; the Jornada and the Relaçam.

== Biography ==
Antonio de Gouvea was born in Beja, Portugal and ordained a priest in the Order of Hermits of St. Augustine on 4 June 1591. On 19 August 1611, he was appointed during the papacy of Pope Paul V as Titular Bishop of Cyrene. On 8 January 1612, he was consecrated bishop by Alexeu de Jesu de Meneses, Archbishop of Goa. He died on 18 August 1628. While bishop, he was the principal co-consecrator of Agustín Spínola Basadone, Bishop of Tortosa (1623), Agustín Antolínez, Bishop of Ciudad Rodrigo (1623), and Juan Roco Campofrío, Bishop of Zamora (1625).

== See also ==
- Dengiz Beg Rumlu

== Sources ==
- Matthee, Rudi (2002). "GOUVEA, ANTONIO DE". Encyclopaedia Iranica, Vol. XI, Fasc. 2. pp. 177–179.
