= Bar Mariam =

"Baṟ Maṟiam"
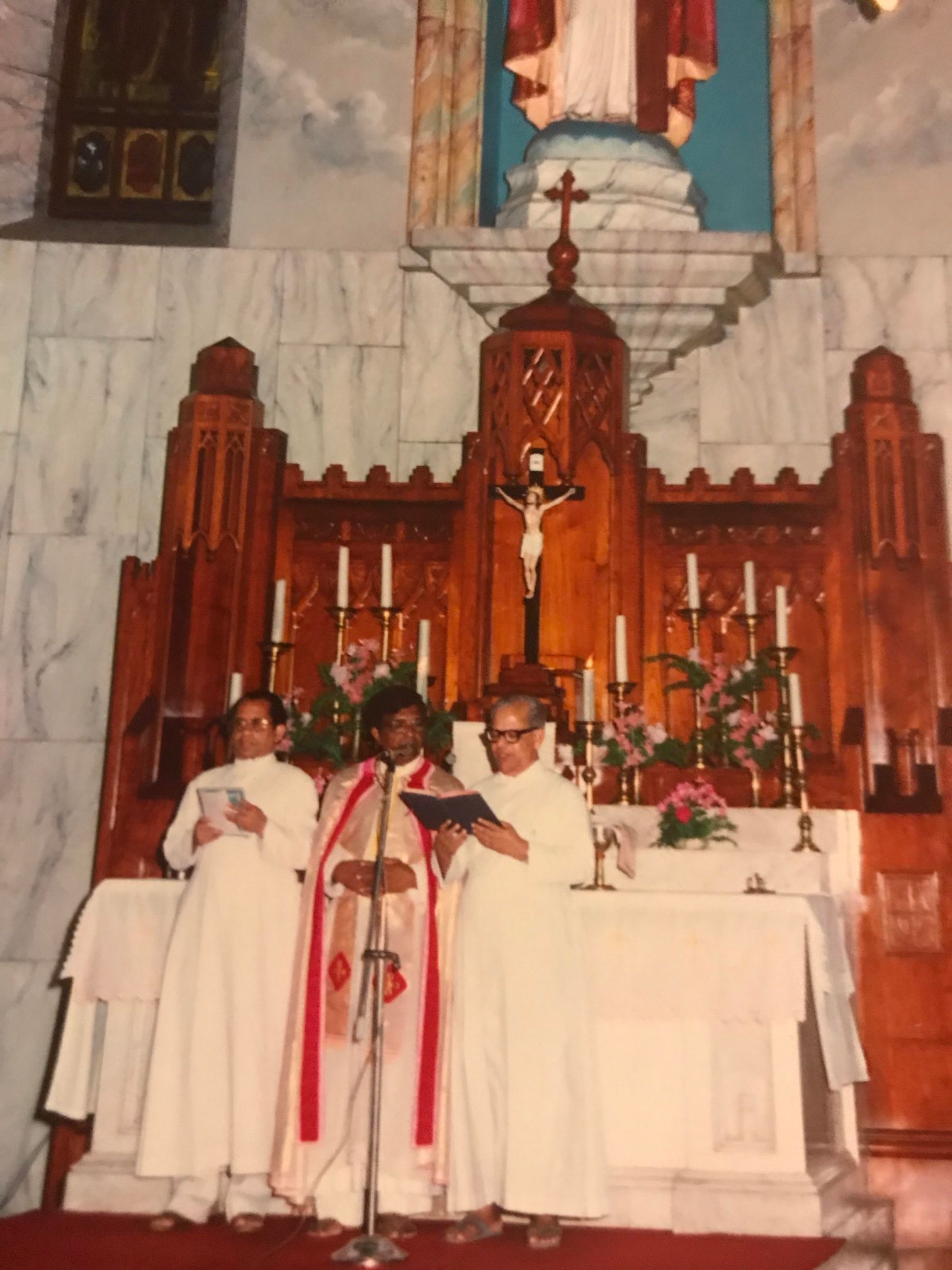
- Knanaya Catholic priests chant Baru Mariam

Song
- Genre: Liturgical Tesbohta (hymn of praise); Paraliturgical hymn
- Length: 4:00-6:00

Music video
- "Bar Mariam" Knanaya Syro-Malabar version on YouTube

Music video
- "Bar Mariam" Assyrian Chaldean Syrian version on YouTube

Baṟ Maṟiam or Baṟŭ Maṟiam is an ancient East Syriac chant distinct to the Church of the East and belongs to a class of Tesbohta in the Hudra proper to the East Syriac midnight liturgy of the Nativity. In popular use, it is most commonly associated with the wedding traditions of the Knanaya Syro-Malabar community in India.

The chant sings about Christ's journey in life, death, and resurrection. In total the chant has 49 couplets (however not all are sung during weddings) and is considered para-liturgical. The chant is sung after the wedding Holy Qurbana (East Syriac Liturgy) of Knanaya Christians is concluded and is chanted by priests and all laymen present. After Bar Maryam is sung the priests sprinkle the newly wedded couple with Holy Water and conclude the ceremony.

== History ==
Bar Mariam is a distinct East Syriac chant of the Church of the East. The Knanaya Catholics use this chant during their wedding ceremonies. The Knanaya are an ethnic-group found within the Saint Thomas Christians of Kerala and are said to be the descendants of Judeo-Christians who migrated to India in the 4th century. The chant was written down for the first time in history by the Knanaya scholar P.U Luke in his text “Puratana Pattukal” or Ancient Songs in 1910.

In 1944 the Syro Malabar priest and writer Joseph Kurmankan ridiculed the Knanaya community for singing Bar Mariam at the conclusion of their wedding ceremonies. Kurmankan stated that the singing of Bar Mariam as a wedding custom was not a tradition found among the Saint Thomas Christians and claimed it to be an improper tradition among the Knanaya.

Since then, the revered Syro Malabar priest and scholar Placid J. Podipara (1899-1985) gave the following description of the chant:

"There is a hymn called “Bar Mariam” (the Son of Mary) which is sung as “paraliturgical” by priests and people at the end of the wedding ceremonies of the Southist (Knanaya Catholic) community of the Chaldeo-Malabar rite. This community traces its origin traditionally to a foreign colony that settled down in Malabar in the 4th century. The hymn is in the Syro-Chaldean language and is translated into the Malayalam characters for the benefit of those who do not know the Syro-Chaldean characters."

== Usage ==
The Knanaya Catholics maintain this chant solely for weddings. It is sung after the conclusion of the wedding Holy Qurbana (East Syriac Liturgy) and is chanted by priests and laymen together. After the chant is over the priests bless the newly weds and sprinkle them with holy water.

== Translation ==
=== Couplets of Bar Mariam in Syriac (Wedding Version) ===
ܒܲܪ ܡܲܪܝܲܡ ܒܲܪ ܡܲܪܝܲܡ
ܒܲܪ ܐܲܠܵܗܵܐ ܝܸܠܕܲܬ݂ ܡܲܪܝܲܡ

Son of Mary, son of Mary
Mary brought forth the Son of God

ܐܵܘܥܝܼ ܣܵܘܟܹܐ ܒܲܪ ܡܲܪܝܲܡ
ܐܲܝܟ ܢܒ݂ܝܘܼܬ݂ܵܐ ܒܲܪ ܡܲܪܝܲܡ

Son of Mary brought forth branches,
According to the prophecy

ܒܲܪ ܡܲܪܝܲܡ ܒܲܪ ܡܲܪܝܲܡ
ܒܲܪ ܐܲܠܵܗܵܐ ܝܸܠܕܲܬ݂ ܡܲܪܝܲܡ

Son of Mary, son of Mary
Mary brought forth the Son of God

ܩܲܕܸܫ ܡܲܝܵܐ ܒܲܪ ܡܲܪܝܲܡ
ܒܡܲܥܡܘܿܕܝܼܬ݂ܹܗ ܒܲܪ ܡܲܪܝܲܡ

Son of Mary sanctified the waters
By his baptism.

ܒܲܪ ܡܲܪܝܲܡ ܒܲܪ ܡܲܪܝܲܡ
ܒܲܪ ܐܲܠܵܗܵܐ ܝܸܠܕܲܬ݂ ܡܲܪܝܲܡ

Son of Mary, son of Mary
Mary brought forth the Son of God

ܫܲܕܲܪ ܪܘܼܚܵܐ ܒܲܪ ܡܲܪܝܲܡ
ܦܵܪܲܩܠܹܛܵܐ ܒܲܪ ܡܲܪܝܲܡ

Son of Mary sent the Spirit,
The Paraclete.

ܒܲܪ ܡܲܪܝܲܡ ܒܲܪ ܡܲܪܝܲܡ
ܒܲܪ ܐܲܠܵܗܵܐ ܝܸܠܕܲܬ݂ ܡܲܪܝܲܡ

Son of Mary, son of Mary
Mary brought forth the Son of God

ܐܸܟܲܠ ܦܸܨܚܵܐ ܒܲܪ ܡܲܪܝܲܡ
ܥܲܡ ܬܲܠܡܝܼܕܲܘܗܝ ܒܲܪ ܡܲܪܝܲܡ

Son of Mary at the Passover meal,
With his disciples

ܒܲܪ ܡܲܪܝܲܡ ܒܲܪ ܡܲܪܝܲܡ
ܒܲܪ ܐܲܠܵܗܵܐ ܝܸܠܕܲܬ݂ ܡܲܪܝܲܡ

Son of Mary, son of Mary
Mary brought forth the Son of God

ܫܘܼܒ݂ܚܵܐ ܠܲܫܡܵܟ ܒܲܪ ܡܲܪܝܲܡ
ܡ݂ܢ ܟܘܿܠ ܦܘܼܡܝܼܢ ܒܲܪ ܡܲܪܝܲܡ

Son of Mary sent the Holy Spirit,
The Paraclete

ܒܲܪ ܡܲܪܝܲܡ ܒܲܪ ܡܲܪܝܲܡ
ܒܲܪ ܐܲܠܵܗܵܐ ܝܸܠܕܲܬ݂ ܡܲܪܝܲܡ

Son of Mary, son of Mary
Mary brought forth the Son of God

ܠܥܵܠܲܡ ܥܲܠܡܝܼܢ ܒܲܪ ܡܲܪܝܲܡ
ܐܵܡܹܝܢ ܘܐܵܡܹܝܢ ܒܲܪ ܡܲܪܝܲܡ

Son of Mary glory be to you name from every mouth,
forever and ever amen

ܒܲܪ ܡܲܪܝܲܡ ܒܲܪ ܡܲܪܝܲܡ
ܒܲܪ ܐܲܠܵܗܵܐ ܝܸܠܕܲܬ݂ ܡܲܪܝܲܡ

Son of Mary, son of Mary
Mary brought forth the Son of God

=== Full Chant English Translation ===
The Son of Mary, the Son of Mary, the Son of God whom Mary brought forth
For us was born in Bethlehem, the Son of Mary, the Son of Mary
The Magi came to the honor of adoration of King Christ whom Mary brought forth
The Son of Mary, made angels come down for the praise of His birth, Son of Mary
And they invited the shepherds for the adoration of King Christ
The Son of Mary called first the keepers of sheep, the Son of Mary
And they adored in the manger the great shepherd, the King Christ
The Son of Mary, His star showed according to prophesy, the Son of Mary
And the Magi of Pares acknowledged that to the earth had come down King Christ whom Mary brought forth
The Son of Mary shook the king, and he sought to kill Him, Son of Mary
He ordered His angel and He warned Joseph to flee to Egypt with Him, King Christ, whom Mary brought forth
The Son of Mary offered sacrifice to His hidden Father, the Son of Mary
The sucklings were sacrificed at the coming of King Christ
The Son of Mary was baptized in Jordan by John, the Son of Mary
On Him descended the Holy Spirit, King Christ
The Father testified about the Son of Mary from the heaven of heavens, the Son of Mary
That this is my Son in whom I am pleased, King Christ
The Son of God sanctified the waters of His baptism, the Son of Mary
And He made them the cleansing womb that brings forth life, King
With you his soul the Son of Mary to raise our fall, Son of Mary
From his servant King Christ asked for baptism
The Son of Mary gave us an example of humility, the Son of Mary
Through it he pacified the Father that we may be brothers of Kind Christ
The Son of Mary fasted in the desert for forty days, the Son of Mary
And He defeated and conquered the devil, King Christ
The Son of Mary shoed His glory on Mount Thabor, the Son of Mary
He appeared to Moses and Elijah, King Christ
The Son of Mary rode on a colt and entered Jerusalem, the Son of Mary
And the children praised Him by their Hosana, King Christ
The Son of Mary ate the pasch with His disciples, the Son of Mary
He gave His body in bread and wine, King Christ
The Son of Mary suffered on the cross through the Jews, the Son of Mary
He bent His head and gave up His spirit, King Christ
The Son of Mary was placed in the tomb for three days, the Son of Mary
And He rose up and raised up Adam who had been corrupt, King Christ
The Son of Mary rose from the tomb with great glory, the Son of Mary
And sat there at the right, King Christ
The Son of Mary sent the Spirit, the paraclete, the Son of Mary
On the disciples and made them wise, King Christ
The Son of Mary, the wood of your crucifixion was found, (O) the Son of Mary on the thirteenth of September, King Christ
The Son of Mary took to Him as spouse the Holy Church, Son of Mary
Through Simon Kepa, the son of Jonah, King Christ
Praise to your name, the Son of Mary, from all mouths, the Son of Mary
Let us all call out and say all together, “Blessed is Christ, for ever and ever, the Son of Mary, Emmanuel, the Son of Mary
