= St. Mary's Valiyapally, Kaduthuruthy =

Kaduthuruthy Valiyapally
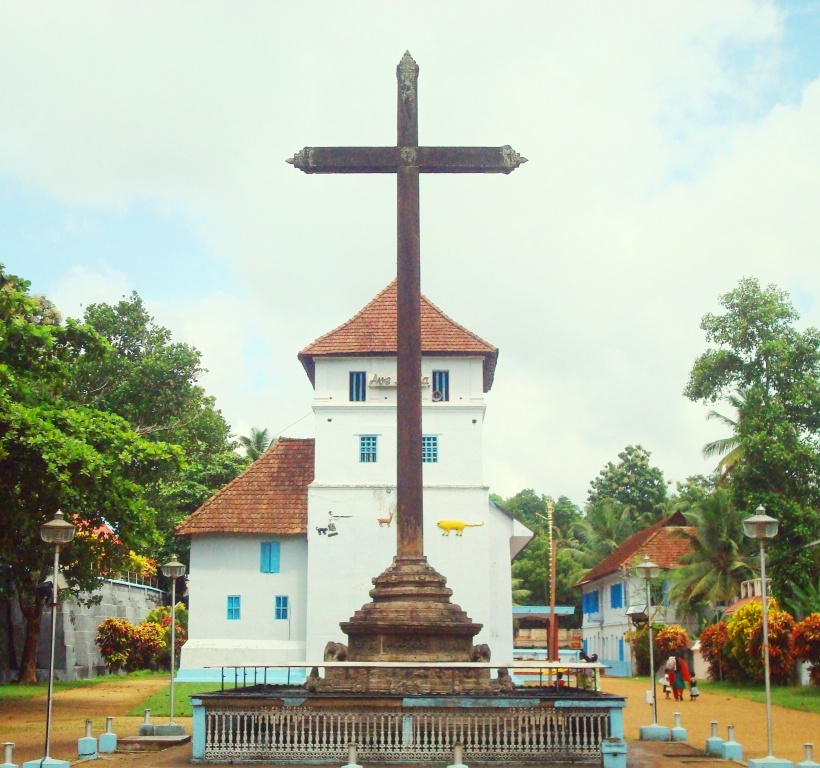
- St.Mary's Knanaya Church
- Denomination: Syro Malabar Christian
- Tradition: East Syriac
- Website: Kaduthuruthy Valiapally

History
- Founded: AD 400

Administration
- Diocese: Syro-Malabar Archeparchy of Kottayam

Kaduthuruthy Marth Mariam Knanaya Major Archiepiscopal Church, commonly called Kaduthuruthy Valiapally or the Great Church of Kaduthuruthy, is a church in Kaduthuruthy, Kerala, India.

== Bibliography ==
- Podipara, Placid J. (1970) The Thomas Christians. London: Darton, Longman and Tidd.
- Poomangalam, C.A. (1998) The Antiquities of the Knanaya Syrian Christians; Kottayam, Kerala.
- Thomas Puthiyakunnel (1973) "Jewish colonies of India paved the way for St. Thomas" in "The Malabar Church" Ed. Jacob Vellian and in "The St. Thomas Christian Encyclopaedia of India," Vol. II, 1973, Ed. George Menachery .
- Fr. Jacob Vellian (2001) Knanite community: History and culture; Syrian church series; vol.XVII; Jyothi Book House, Kottayam
- George Menachery, (1973) The St. Thomas Christian Encyclopedia of India, Ed. George Menachery, B.N.K. Press, vol. 2, ISBN 81-87132-06-X.
- George Menachery Ed., (1998) The Indian Church History Classics, Vol. I, The Nazranies & "The Thomapedia" Ed. George Menachery, for many articles on and dozens of photographs of the Kaduthuruthy Big Church.
