= St. Mary, Queen of Peace Basilica =

St. Mary Queen of Peace Basilica, Palayam, Trivandrum
- Samadhana Rajgni Malankara Suriani Catholica Basilica, Palayam, Trivandrum
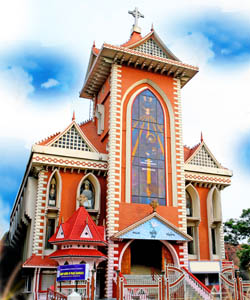
- Front of the Basilica

- 8.503°N 76.95°E
- Location: Palayam, Trivandrum – 695 034, Kerala
- Country: Republic of India
- Denomination: Syro-Malankara Catholic Church
- Website: Syro-Malankara Catholic Church

History
- Founded: 1933
- Founders: Metropolitan Archbishop Mar Ivanios
- Dedication: St. Mary, Queen of Peace
- Dedicated: 11 March 1933

Architecture
- Style: Indian Neo-Gothic

Administration
- Diocese: Major Archieparchy of Trivandrum
- Parish: Palayam

Clergy
- Bishop: Moran Mor Baselios Cleemis
- Priest: Rev. Dr. John Kuttiyil

The St. Mary, Queen of Peace Basilica, located in the Palayam/Cantonment area of the city of Thiruvananthapuram, in the state of Kerala, India, is the first Syro-Malankara Catholic Church to be elevated to the rank of a Catholic basilica. It is the fifth basilica in Kerala.

On 10 November 2008, at the St. Mary's Cathedral, Pattom, Trivandrum, Leonardo Sandri, Papal representative and Cardinal Prefect of the Congregation for the Oriental Churches, announced the designation of the Queen of Peace Pro-Cathedral in Thiruvananthapuram as a basilica. Major Archbishop Moran Mor Baselios Cleemis Catholicos dedicated the church as the St. Mary, Queen of Peace Basilica on 7 December 2008. Kerala Minister for Law, Sports and Youth Affairs M. Vijayakumar presided over a meeting that followed.

== History ==
The former Pompador Cinema Theatre in the Palayam area of Trivandrum was converted into a church, and consecrated on 11 March 1933. The enthronement of Archbishop Mar Ivanios took place in this pro-cathedral on the same day. The roof of the new church was made of tin sheets, therefore people called it the 'Tin Church' (Thakara Palli). In 1991 the 'Tin Church' was replaced with a new building; Archbishop Benedict Mar Gregorios dedicated this new church to St. Mary, Queen of Peace. The Church was renovated and blessed by Major Archbishop Cardinal Moran Mor Baselios Cleemis on 4 October 2019.

== See also ==
- St. Mary's Cathedral, Pattom, Trivandrum
