= List of major archbishops of Thiruvananthapuram =

His Eminence Baselios Cardinal Cleemis
- Major Archbishop-Catholicos of Thiruvananthapuram
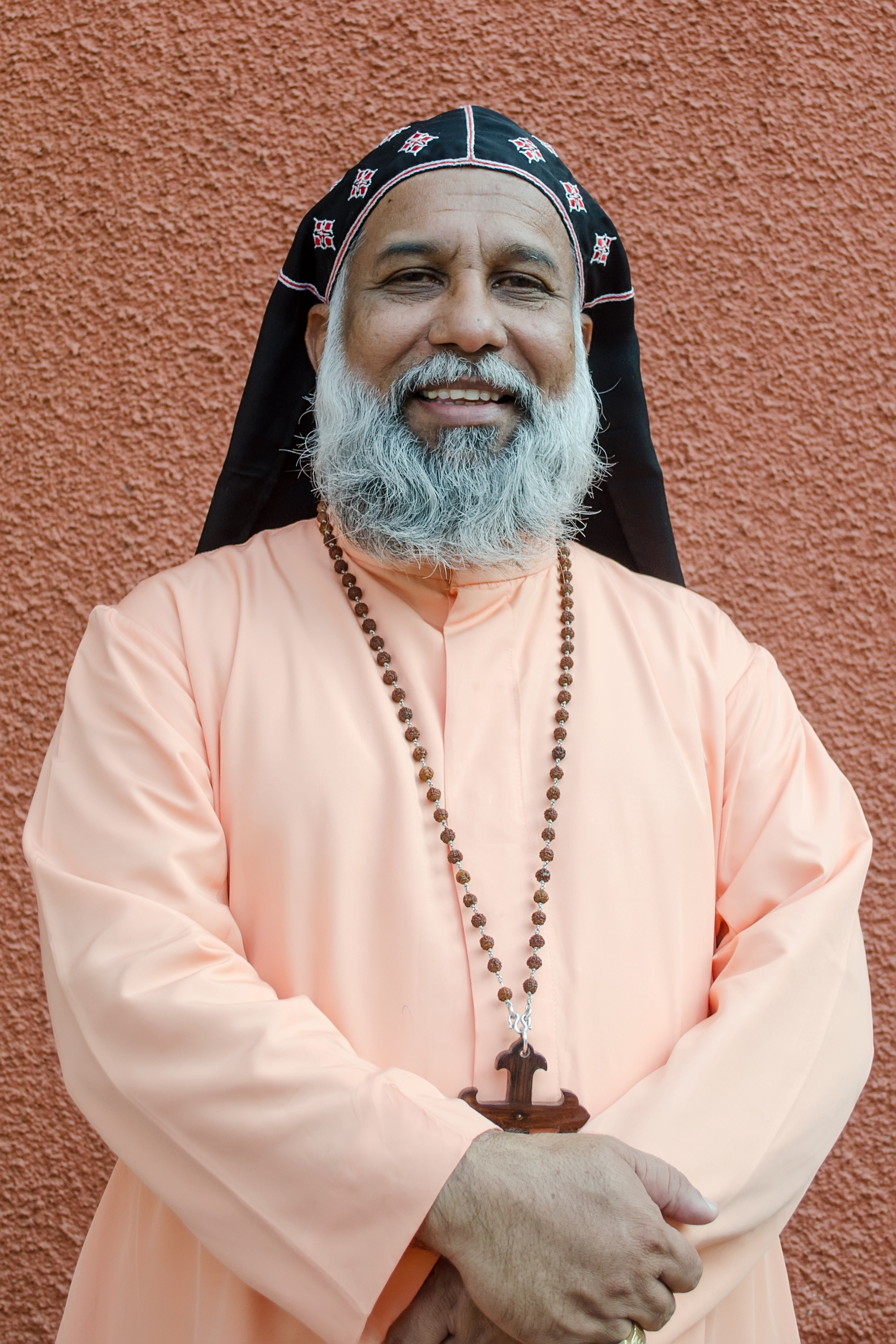
- Baselios Cardinal Cleemis Catholicos
- Native name: ബസേലിയോസ് കര്ദ്ദിനാള് ക്ലിമ്മീസ് കാതോലിക്കാ ബാവ
- Church: Syro-Malankara Catholic Church
- Archdiocese: Thiruvananthapuram
- See: Thiruvananthapuram
- Appointed: 10 February 2007
- Installed: 5 March 2007
- Predecessor: Cyril Baselios Malancharuvil
- Other post: Cardinal-Priest of San Gregorio VII

Orders
- Ordination: 11 June 1986 by Cyril Baselios Malancharuvil
- Consecration: 15 August 2001 by Cyril Baselios Malancharuvil
- Created cardinal: 24 November 2012
- Rank: Cardinal-Priest

The Major Archbishop-Catholicos of Thiruvananthapuram is the head of the Major Archdiocese of Thiruvananthapuram in Thiruvananthapuram, Kerala, India. The Major Archbishop, a position equivalent to Patriarch and locally called as Head & Father of Syro-Malankara Catholic Church.

Pope Pius XI, through the Apostolic Constitution Christo Pastorum Principi of 11 June 1932, established the Syro-Malankara Hierarchy for the reunited community and erected the Archiparchy of Thiruvananthapuram with the Eparchy of Tiruvalla as its suffragan. The Metropolitan Eparchy of Thiruvananthapuram was established in 1933. Mar Ivanios was enthroned as its first Metropolitan Archbishop. The Eparchy of Tiruvalla was established in 1933. Jacob Mor Theophilos was enthroned as its first bishop.

On 10 February 2005, the Syro-Malankara Catholic Church was raised to the status of a Major Archiepiscopal Church on that day by the papal document Ab ipso Sancto Thoma, and as such possesses a high level of autonomy under the Code of Canons of the Eastern Churches. Archbishop Pedro López Quintana, the Apostolic Nuncio in India, read the official declaration at St. Mary's Cathedral, Pattom, Thiruvananthapuram. The Hierarchical Head of the Church became a Major Archbishop who exercises patriarchal powers and governs the Church assisted by the Holy Synod of Bishops of the Church. The title “Catholicos” is used according to the Antiochene-Malankara Tradition in referring to the "Major Archbishop" (a term recently adopted by the Latin Church to refer to Eastern bishops equal to patriarchal authority, without an historical Patriarchate).

The Father and Head of the Syro-Malankara Catholic Church, Baselios Cleemis was elevated to the College of Cardinals of the Catholic Church by Pope Benedict XVI at the Papal Basilica of Saint Peter in the Vatican on 24 November 2012. As Cardinal-Priest he was assigned the titular church of San Gregorio VII.

== Archbishops of Thiruvananthapuram ==
| No. | Portrait | Name (Birth–Death) | Tenure |
|---|---|---|---|
| 1 | | Geevarghese Mar Ivanios, OIC (1882-1953) | 1932–1953 |
| – | Vacant | | 1953–1955 |
| 2 | | Benedict Mar Gregorios, OIC (1916-1994) | 1955–1994 |
| 3 | | Cyril Mar Baselios, OIC (1935-2007) | 1995–2005 |

== Major Archbishop-Catholicoi of Thiruvananthapuram ==
| No. | Portrait | Name (Birth–Death) | Tenure |
|---|---|---|---|
| 1 | | Cyril Baselios Catholicos, OIC (1935-2007) | 2005–2007 |
| 2 | | Baselios Cardinal Cleemis Catholicos (1959-) | 2007–Present |
