= Archdiocese of Trivandrum (disambiguation) =

Archdioceses of Trivandrum may refer to:

- Archdiocese of Trivandrum, of the Latin Church of the Catholic Church
- Syro-Malankara Major Archdiocese of Trivandrum, of the Syro-Malankara Catholic Church
  - Now known as Syro-Malankara Catholic Major Archeparchy of Trivandrum
