= Benedict Gregorios =

Indian Eastern Catholic archbishop

His Grace Aboon Mor Benedict Mor Gregorios OIC
- Metropolitan Archbishop of Trivandrum
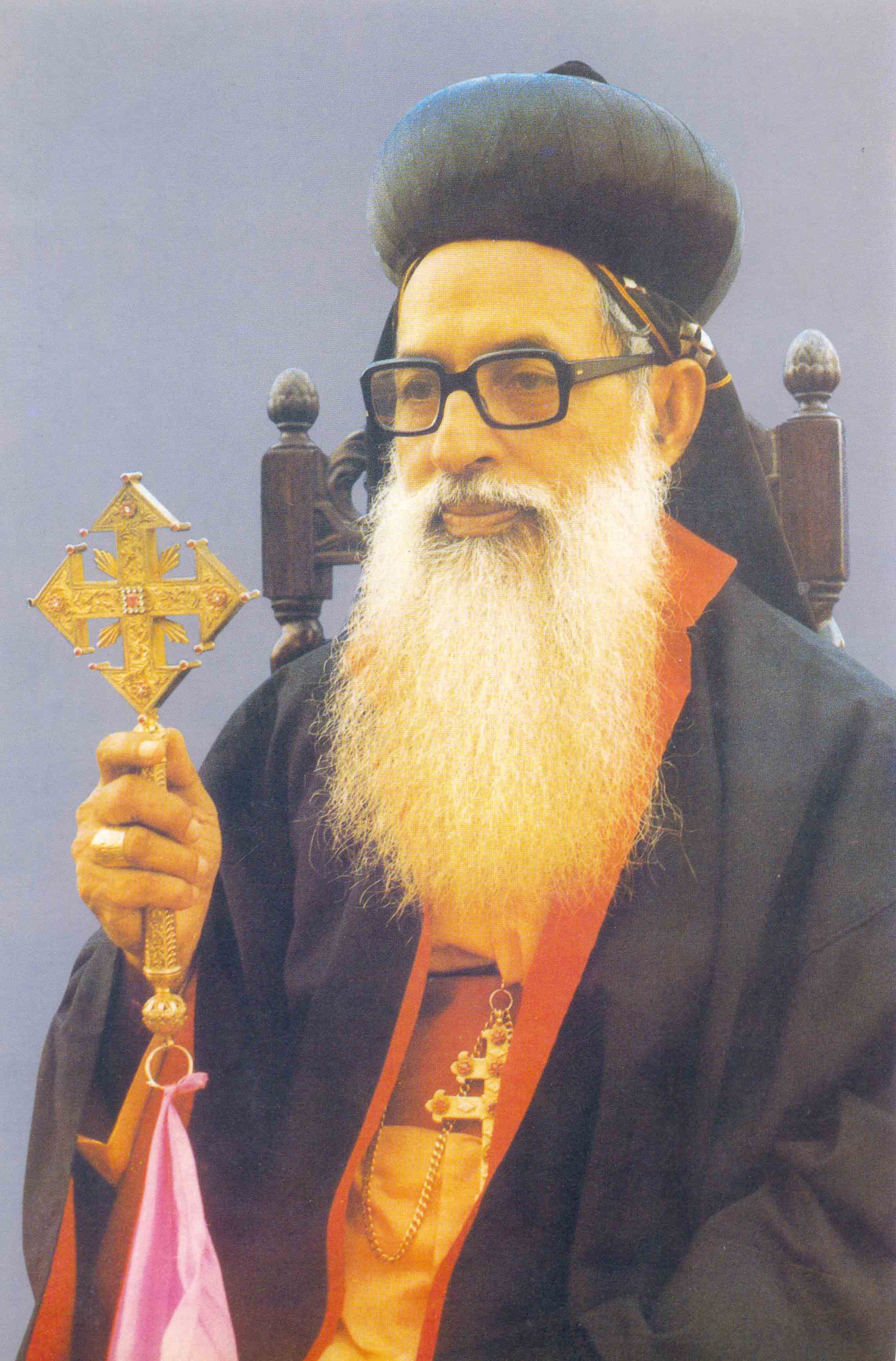
- Church: Syro-Malankara Catholic Church
- See: Trivandrum, India
- Appointed: 27 January 1955
- Term ended: 10 October 1994
- Predecessor: Geevarghese Ivanios
- Successor: Cyril Baselios
- Previous posts: St. Aloysius Seminary, Trivandrum

Orders
- Ordination: 24 August 1940
- Consecration: 29 January 1953 by Archbishop Geevarghese Ivanios

Personal details
- Born: Varghese Thangalathil; 1 February 1916 Kalloopara, Travancore, British Raj
- Died: 10 October 1994 (aged 78) Trivandrum, Kerala

Benedict Mor Gregorios (1 February 1916 – 10 October 1994) was the second metropolitan archbishop of the Syro-Malankara Catholic Church.

== Life ==
Gregorios or "Thangalathil Thirumeni" was born and raised in the Malankara Orthodox Church in Kalloopara, present day Pathanamthitta district. He was baptised by the name Varghese Thangalathil. As a teenage boy Varghese came closer to the ideal of Bethany Ashram. He was attracted by the personality of Geevarghese Ivanios and later became a member of Bethany Ashram and adopted the name Benedict. He studied philosophy and theology at Papal Seminary, Kandy, Sri Lanka. He was ordained a religious priest of Bethany Ashram by then Bishop of Kandy Bernad Reinjo in 1944. As a dynamic young priest he taught Syriac for some time in St. Aloysius Seminary, Trivandrum. He was sent for higher studies in economics to St. Joseph's College, Trichy (1946–1949). He became the first principal of Mar Ivanios College.

He was consecrated as bishop on January 29, 1953, by the hands of Archbishop Ivanios, and he received the name Benedict Mar Gregorios. After the death of Ivanios, Gregorios became the second metropolitan archbishop of the Syro-Malankara Catholic Church in 1955. Parish communities were formed in Syro-Malankara Catholic Church during this period. Gregorios paved the way to establish Mar Theophilos Training College, Trivandrum and Mar Gregorios College of Arts and Science, Chennai. After 41 years of episcopal ministry, Gregorios died on 10 October 1994. His body was entombed in St. Mary's Cathedral, Pattom, Trivandrum.

St. John's College, Anchal, a first grade arts and science college in Kollam district was established by Gregorios. St. John's College Anchal became the nerve centre of the total development of a remote rural village into a fast developing township.

== Sources ==
Thomas Inchaykkalodi, Archbishop Mar Ivanios, Vol. 1, Bethany Publications, Kottayam, 2006.

Catholic Church titles
Preceded by Geevarghese Ivanios	Metropolitan Archbishop of Trivandrum; 1955–1994	Succeeded by Cyril Baselios as Major Archbishop of Trivandrum
