= Choonduviral =

Indian TV current affairs program

- The title logo of the series
- Genre: News; Current affairs
- Created by: Manorama News
- Presented by: Abgeoth Varghese
- Country of origin: India
- Original language: Malayalam

Production
- Running time: 25 minutes

Original release
- Network: Manorama News

Choondu Viral (English: The Pointer Finger) is an Indian weekly current affairs documentary program in Malayalam television channel Manorama News, operated and managed by Malayala Manorama Television.

The program is usually presented and produced by Abgeoth Varghese, a Special Correspondent of Manorama News.

In 2017, the program won three Kerala State Television Awards (chosen by Kerala Film Academy for the Kerala Ministry of Cultural Affairs). The award-winning episodes discussed issues such as the rights of saleswomen in Kerala commercial retail stores and the lack of expected holidays for school children in Kerala.

Varghese, a former student leader from Mar Ivanios College, Trivandrum, generally presents program from a left-of-centre point of view.
