= List of Syro-Malankara Catholics =

Notable Syro-Malankara Catholics include:

== Syro-Malankara leaders ==
=== Major archbishops ===
- Baselios Cleemis Cardinal Thottunkal, Major Archbishop of Trivandrum, India
- Archbishop Cyril Baselios Malancharuvil, O.I.C., Major Archbishop of Trivandrum, India

=== Archbishops ===
- Archbishop Paulos Philoxinos Ayyamkulangara, Auxiliary Bishop of Trivandrum, India
- Archbishop Thomas Koorilos Chakkalapadickal, Archbishop of Tiruvalla, India
- Archbishop Benedict Varghese Gregorios Thangalathil, O.I.C., Archbishop of Trivandrum, India
- Archbishop Severios Giuseppe Valakuzhyil, Bishop of Tiruvalla, India
- Archbishop Ivanios Givergis Thomas Panikervitis, Archbishop of Trivandrum, India
- Archbishop George Panamthundil, Apostolic Nuncio to Kazakhstan

=== Bishops ===
- Bishop Jacob Barnabas Chacko Aerath, O.I.C., Bishop of Saint John Chrysostom of Gurgaon, India
- Bishop Geevarghese Timotheos Chundevalel, Bishop Emeritus of Tiruvalla, India
- Bishop Abraham Youlios Kackanatt, Bishop Emeritus of Muvattupuzha, India
- Bishop Mathews Pachomius Kadavil, O.I.C., Bishop of Saint Ephrem of Khadki, India
- Bishop Antony Silvanos Kakkanatt, Curial Bishop of Trivandrum, India
- Bishop Jacob Abraham Theophilos Kalapurakal, Bishop Emeritus of Tiruvalla, India
- Bishop Geevarghese Makarios Kalayil, Bishop of Puthur, India
- Bishop Yoohanon Chrysostom Kalloor, Bishop Emeritus of Pathanamthitta, India
- Bishop Samuel Irenios Kattukallil, Bishop of Pathanamthitta, India
- Bishop Joshuah Ignathios Kizhakkeveettil, Bishop of Mavelikara, India
- Bishop Yoohanon Theodosius Kochuthundil, Bishop of Muvattupuzha, India
- Bishop Joseph Thomas Konnath, Bishop of Bathery (Battery), India
- Bishop Isaac Youhanon Koottaplakil, Bishop of Tiruvalla, India
- Bishop Vincent Paulos Kulapuravilai, Bishop of Marthandom, India
- Bishop Mathew Polycarpos Manakkarakavil, Auxiliary Bishop of Trivandrum, India
- Bishop Thomas Eusebios Naickamparampil, Bishop of Parassala, India
- Bishop Athanasios Cheriyan Polachirakal, Bishop of Tiruvalla, India
- Bishop Thomas Antonios Valiyavilayil, O.I.C., Bishop of Saint John Chrysostom of Gurgaon, India
- Bishop Geevarghese Divannasios Ottathengil, Bishop Emeritus of Puthur, India
- Bishop Philippos Stephanos Thottathil, Bishop of Saint Mary, Queen of Peace, USA
- Bishop Lawrence Ephraem Thottam, Bishop of Marthandom, India

List of archbishops and bishops adapted from the web site Catholic-Hierarchy.org.

== Non-religious ==
- Alexander Jacob, police officer
