= St. Mary's Malankara Major Seminary =

- Motto: To continue Jesus' mission of love and service
- Type: Centre of priestly training
- Established: June 29, 1983
- Religious affiliation: Syro-Malankara Catholic Church
- Academic staff: 57
- Students: 181
- Location: Pattom, Thiruvananthapuram, Kerala, India

St. Mary's Malankara Syrian Catholic Major Seminary is a centre of priestly training for the Syro-Malankara Catholic Church.

== History ==
Following its inception in 1930, the Malankara Catholic Church had desired a major seminary of its own for the training of its clergy. The desire to set up a major seminary had been voiced from several quarters of the Church and the campaign gathered momentum in 1980 at the Golden Jubilee Celebrations of the Reunion Movement of the Syro-Malankara Catholic Church. The Delegate of the Pope, Wladyslav Cardinal Rubin, the then Prefect of the Congregation for the Oriental Churches, encouraged the project.

The establishment of a Major seminary to train the Syro-Malankara Catholic clergy had been envisaged by the Holy See of Rome at the time of the Reunion of Archbishop Mar Ivanios. St. Mary's Malankara Major Seminary was inaugurated at Pattom, Thiruvananthapuram, Kerala on 29 June 1983. The Holy See granted formal recognition to the seminary on 8 September 1984. As a temporary arrangement, the seminary started operating in the building of St. Aloysius Minor Seminary of the Metropolitan Eparchy of Trivandrum at Pattom, Thiruvananthapuram. The major seminary moved to the new building at Bethany Hills, Nalanchira, Thiruvananthapuram on 25 May 1989.

On 11 April 2005 the Faculty of Theology of St. Mary's Malankara Major Seminary became affiliated with Rome's Pontifical Urbaniana University. The silver jubilee of the Malankara Major Seminary that commenced on Thursday, 29 June 2007 was officially inaugurated on Tuesday, 2 October 2007 by Moran mor Baselios Cleemis and its concluding celebrations were held from 5–8 November 2007.

== Theology course ==
The theology course of the seminary is of 4 years and the philosophy course is of 3 years. The seminary offers training for the students of eparchies and religious institutes of the Syro-Malankara Catholic Church. A few students of the Syro Malabar and the Latin Church also get training here.

The motto of the Major Seminary is "To continue Jesus' mission of love and service".

The Seminary have 29 professors for Theology and 28 Professors for Philosophy. In 2019, the Major Seminary had 237 students (111 in Philosophy and 126 in Theology).

== MS Publications ==
M S Publications is the publication wing of Malankara Seminary. Dr. Jolly Karimpil is the Director of M S Publications.

== Apostolate of Social Action (ASA) ==
The Apostolate of Social Action (ASA) is a social upliftment wing of St. Mary's Malankara Seminary which follows Christ who divided himself as an example of sharing. ASA operates to help the brethren inside or outside of the seminary by understanding their needs and help them to develop their understanding of social responsibility and foster an attitude of social service. The seminarians who are the ASA's members involve themselves in the service of the poor, sick and needy so as to obtain experience and training for their future ministry.

Service activities such as visiting hospitals, families, juvenile homes and jails are organized by this wing. The wing raises funds for its activities through the self-sacrificing efforts of the members. It also organizes various humanitarian services such as blood donation and taking care of the poor and the needy who comes to the seminary. More details go to ASA's website: apostolateofsocialaction.in

== See also ==
- Syro-Malankara Catholic Church
- Bethany Ashram
