= Bethany Madhom =

Bethany Madom
- ബഥനി മഠം

Monastery information
- Order: Sisters of the Imitation of Christ
- Established: 1 May 1925
- Controlled churches: Syro-Malankara Catholic Church

People
- Founder(s): Geevarghese Mar Ivanios
- Website: www.bethanysisters.com

The Congregation of the Sisters of the Imitation of Christ (SIC), also known as Bethany Madhom, is a congregation in the Syro-Malankara Catholic Church. It was founded by the Servant of God Archbishop Geevarghese Mar Ivanios on 1 May 1925, originally in the Malankara Orthodox Church. The entire congregation reunited with the Catholic Church in 1930 following the reunion movement.

The Bethany Sisters are the female counterpart to the Order of the Imitation of Christ (Bethany Ashram), which was founded by Mar Ivanios in 1919.
