= Cathedral of Saint Mary, Pattom =

St. Mary’s Malankara Syrian Catholic Cathedral, Pattom, Trivandrum
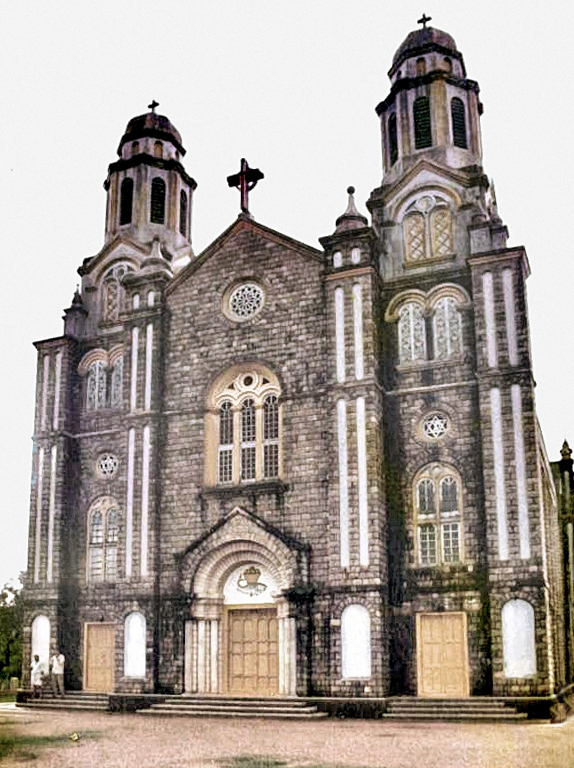
- Façade of the St. Mary`s Syro-Malankara Cathedral
- St. Mary’s Malankara Syrian Catholic Cathedral, Pattom, Trivandrum
- 8°31′34″N 76°56′17″E
- Location: Pattom, Trivandrum - 695 004, Kerala
- Country: India
- Denomination: Syro-Malankara Catholic Church
- Religious institute: The Syro-Malankara Catholic Church

History
- Founded: 1950
- Founder: Metropolitan Archbishop Mar Ivanios
- Dedicated: 22 February 1965

Architecture
- Style: Baroque

Administration
- Diocese: Syro-Malankara Catholic Major Archeparchy of Trivandrum

Clergy
- Vicar: Fr. Dr. George Thomas
- Priest(s): Fr. Dr. George Thomas, Fr. Varghese Malayil

St. Mary's Malankara Syrian Catholic Cathedral, Pattom, Trivandrum is the central place of worship of the Syro-Malankara Catholic Church. It is the seat of the Major Archbishop of Trivandrum. The tombs of The Venerable Archbishop Geevarghese Mar Ivanios, Archbishop Benedict Mar Gregorios and of Major Archbishop Cyril Baselios Catholicos are located here.

The foundation stone of this cathedral was laid by Archbishop Mar Ivanios in 1950, and the cathedral was consecrated by Archbishop Benedict Mar Gregorios on 22 February 1965.

Pope John Paul II visited the cathedral on 8 February 1986.

The cathedral was renovated in 2008. The blessing of the renovated cathedral was on 8 November 2008. There were 531 families in the parish community.

== Sources ==
- Directory -2006, St. Mary's Metropolitan Church, Thiruvananthapuram.

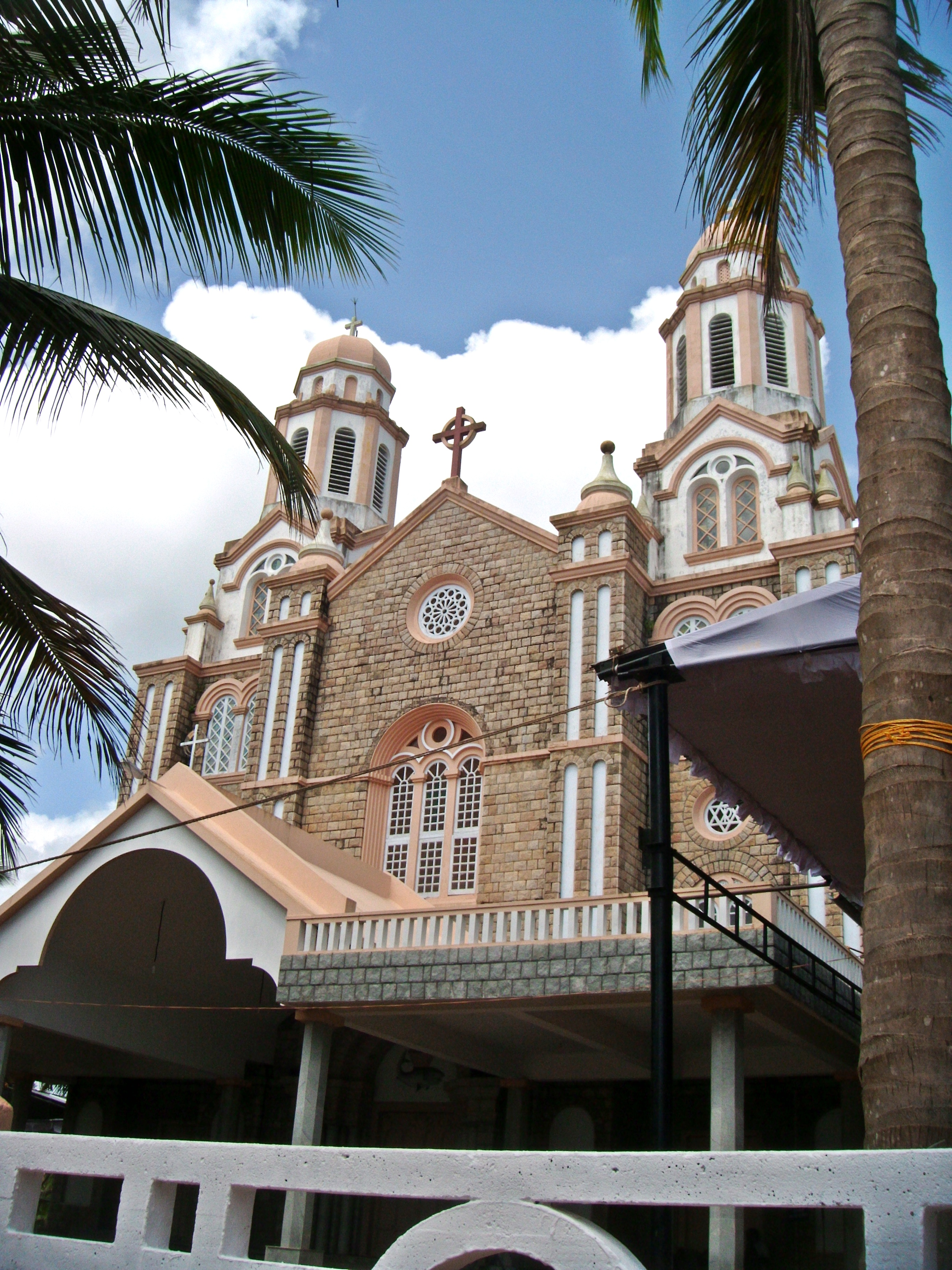
Another View
