= Churches of Kerala =

Churches in Indian state of Kerala

Most churches in Kerala follow the tradition of Syrian Christians, known as Saint Thomas Christians (also called Syrian Christians of India, Nasrani, Malankara Nasrani, and Nasrani Mappila). The remainder of religious people in Kerala are Latin Catholics, or part of a minority of Protestant Christians.

St. Thomas, one of the primary disciples of Jesus Christ, is believed to have visited India during the 1st century and founded eight churches in Kerala, the foremost being St. Mary's Church. The church is located at Niranam, near Thiruvalla, and many ancient relics are still preserved in its museum.

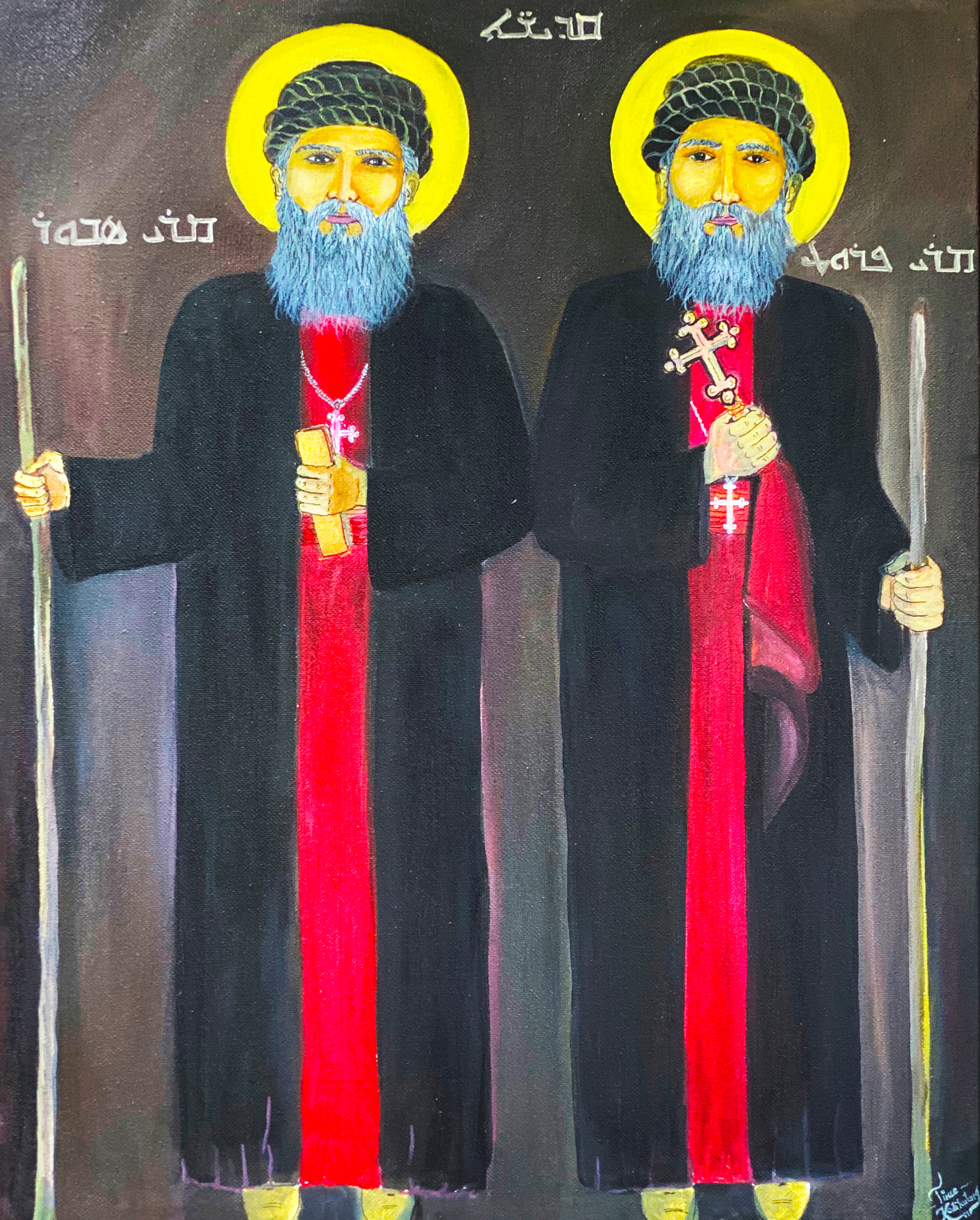
Mar Sabor and Mar Proth

== List of Metropolitan of all Episcopal Churches in India ==
The list of Metropolitans who have served the church include the Syro-Malankara Catholic Church,Malankara Orthodox Syrian Church, Jacobite Syrian Christian Church, Malankara Mar Thoma Syrian Church, Chaldean Syrian Church, Malabar Independent Syrian Church, St. Thomas Evangelical Church of India, and Malankara Evangelical Church.

== See also ==
- Syro-Malankara Catholic Church
- Syro-Malabar Church
- Jacobite Syrian Christian Church
- Malankara Orthodox Syrian Church
- Malankara Mar Thoma Syrian Church
- Assemblies of God in India
- India Pentecostal Church of God
- Chaldean Syrian Church
- Malabar Independent Syrian Church
- St. Thomas Evangelical Church of India
