= Major archiepiscopal church =

Type of ecclesiastical governance

Major archiepiscopal churches are Eastern Catholic Churches governed by major archbishops, assisted by their respective synods of bishops. These Catholic churches also have almost the same rights and obligations as patriarchal churches. A major archbishop is the metropolitan of a see determined or recognized by the Holy See, who presides over an entire sui iuris Eastern Church, but who is not distinguished with the patriarchal title. What is said in canon law of patriarchal churches and patriarchs is understood to be applicable also to major archiepiscopal churches and major archbishops, unless canon law expressly provides otherwise or it is evident from the nature of the matter (CCEO.151, 152).

The four major archiepiscopal churches in the Catholic Church are:

- Ukrainian Greek Catholic Church (UGCC) (Byzantine Rite) - Major Archbishop Sviatoslav Shevchuk (Many in this Church claim patriarchal dignity for it, but the Holy See recognizes it only as a major archiepiscopal Church.)
- Syro-Malabar Catholic Church (East Syriac Rite) - Major Archbishop Mar Rappael Thattil.
- Syro-Malankara Catholic Church (West Syriac Rite) - Major Archbishop Cardinal Baselios Cleemis.
- Romanian Greek Catholic Church also called Romanian Church United with Rome, Greek-Catholic (Byzantine Rite) - Major Archbishop Cardinal Claudiu-Lucian Pop.
