= Cyril Baselios =

Syro-Malankara Catholic major archbishop (1935–2007)

His Grace Cyril Baselios Catholicos OIC
- Major Archbishop-Catholicos, Basileus, Major Archbishop of Malankara Catholic Church
- Baselios in episcopal vestments
- Church: Syro-Malankara Catholic Church
- Archdiocese: Trivandrum
- See: Trivandrum, India
- Appointed: 6 November 1995
- Term ended: 18 January 2007
- Predecessor: Benedict Gregorios
- Successor: Baselios Cleemis
- Previous post: Metropolitan Bishop of Bathery (1978–1995)

Orders
- Ordination: 4 October 1960
- Consecration: 28 December 1978 by Benedict Gregorios

Personal details
- Born: James Malancharuvil; 16 August 1935 Pandalam, Travancore
- Died: 18 January 2007 (aged 71) Trivandrum, Kerala

Styles of Moran Mor Cyril Baselios
- Reference style: His Grace; The Most Reverend
- Spoken style: Your Grace
- Religious style: Major Archbishop

Moran Mor Cyril Baselios Catholicos or, when referencing his title of Major Archbishop, Cyril Baselios Malancharuvil OIC (born James Malancharuvil, 16 August 1935 –18 January 2007) was the first major archbishop of the Syro-Malankara Catholic Church. He was elevated by Pope John Paul II in 1995.

== Early life ==
He was born in Pandalam, Kerala on 16 August 1935. His birth name was James Malancharuvil.

In 1951 he entered in the Order of the Imitation of Christ (O.I.C.) and took the religious name of Cyril. He studied in Rome and was ordained priest on 4 October 1960.

=== Education ===
He received a doctorate in canon law from the Pontifical Gregorian University in Rome in 1965, after taking a master's degree in psychology from St. John's University in New York City. He taught at St. Thomas Apostolic Seminary in Kottayam and St. Joseph's Pontifical Institute, Mangalapuzha, Aluva.

== Career ==
He was named as Eparch (Bishop) of the suffragan Diocese of Bathery on 28 October 1978, and consecrated on 28 December 1978 by Benedict Gregorios with the name Cyril Baselios.

He was made Metropolitan Archbishop and head of the Syro-Malankara Catholic Church on 6 November 1995. He received the archiepiscopal pallium from Pope John Paul II on 9 January 1996 in Vatican City.

=== Major Archbishop ===
The Syro-Malankara Catholic Church raised to the status of a Major Archiepiscopal Church sui iuris on 10 February 2005 according to the norms of CCEO. He was the first Syro-Malakara to bear the title of Major Archbishop and his official title according to the West Syriac Tradition was Moran Mor Cyril Baselios Catholicos, which was earlier granted to the Syro-Malabar metropolitanate of Ernakulam–Angamaly and the Ukrainian Catholic Metropolitanate of Kyiv–Halyč and shortly after to the Romanian Catholic Metropolitanate of Făgăraş şi Alba Iulia. His motto is 'trust in love'.

He had good ecumenical relations with the Indian Orthodox Church, Syriac Orthodox Church, Mar Thoma Church and other St. Thomas churches.

Baselios died of a heart attack on 18 January 2007, in Trivandrum.

Catholic Church titles
Preceded by Benedict Mar Gregorios as Metropolitan Archbishop of Trivandrum	Major Archbishop of Trivandrum; 1995–2007	Succeeded by Baselios Cleemis
