= Pushpagiri Medical College =

Medical college in Thiruvalla, Kerala

Pushpagiri Institute of Medical Sciences and Research Centre
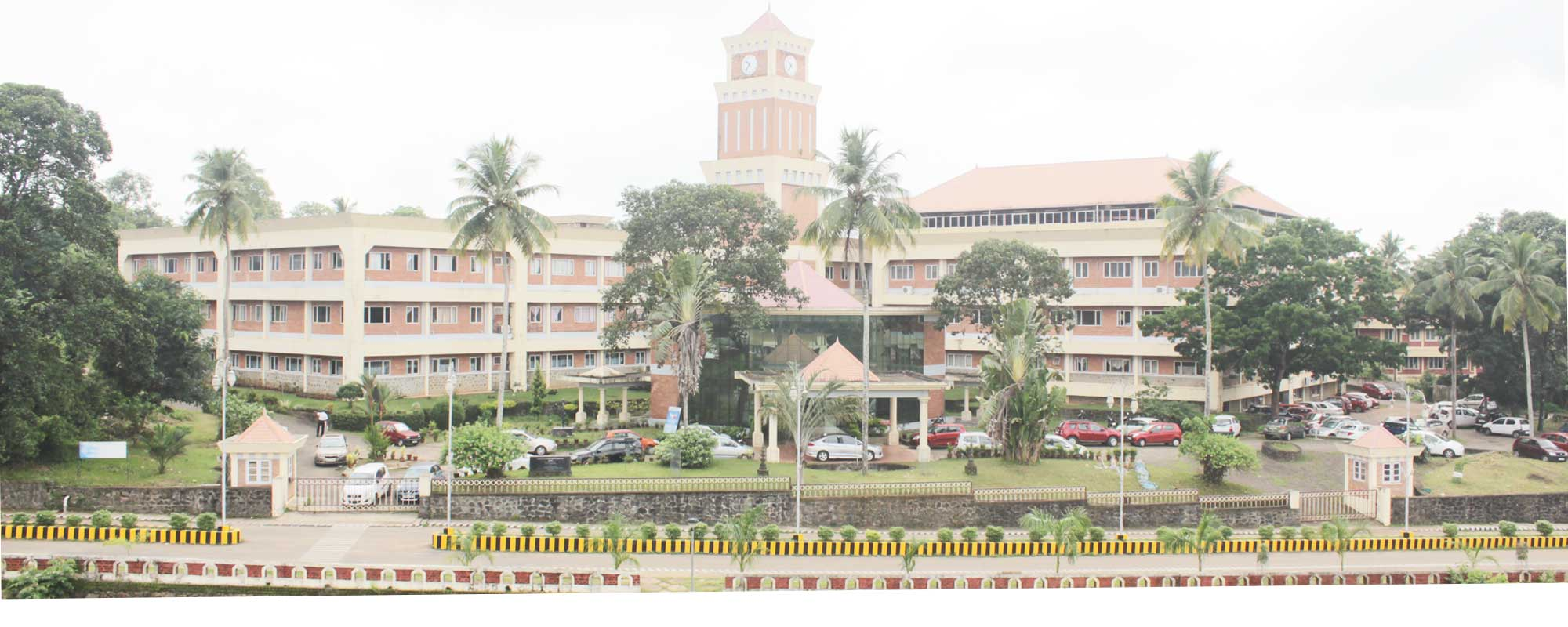
- Pushpagiri Institute of Medical Sciences and Research Centre
- Established: August 15, 1959
- Affiliations: National Medical Commission
- Location: Thiruvalla,, Kerala, India; 9.381°N 76.581°E
- Language: English
- Website: pushpagiri.in pimsrc.edu.in

Pushpagiri Medical College is a 678-bed, multidisciplinary, speciality hospital in Thiruvalla, Kerala, India. It is administered by Thiruvalla Archeparchy of the Syro-Malankara Catholic Church. The hospital began as an eight-bed clinic in 1959 and was recognized as a teaching hospital in 2002. The hospital is certified by the International Organization for Standardization's (ISO) 9001:2000 standards and India's National Accreditation Board for Hospitals & Healthcare Providers (NABH).
