= Pattom =

- Suburb
- Location in Kerala Location in India
- Coordinates: 8.5184600°N 76.945610°E
- Country: India
- State: Kerala
- District: Thiruvananthapuram
- Talukas: Thiruvananthapuram

Languages
  - Official: Malayalam, English
- Time zone: UTC+5:30 (IST)
- Vehicle registration: KL-01

Pattom is a dense commercial region of Thiruvananthapuram city in Kerala, India. It is located approximately 4 kilometres north of centre of Thampanoor. Pattom is largely a residential area, also housing few important administration offices of Kerala State and a few shopping complexes. It has offices of Kerala Public Service Commission, Kerala State Planning Board, Life Insurance Corporation of India, Thiruvananthapuram Divisional Office, LIC Housing Finance Limited, State Resource Centre, District Panjayat Headquarters, Fire and Rescue Department Headquarters, Kerala Co-operative Milk Marketing Federation (Milma), Employees Provident Fund Regional Office and Kerala State Electricity Board. The Traffic Police and Telecommunication department, and the Kerala Science, Technology and Environment Head Office (Sasthra Bhavan) are also located in Pattom.

Pattom is a major stop for buses plying to and from Thiruvananthapuram Central Bus Station and City Bus Station at East Fort. It makes as one of the busy intersections in Thiruvananthapuram with the meeting point of four roads including NH 66 to North Kerala as well as a Road to Kowdiar Palace. Thiruvananthapuram International Airport at Shanghumugham is 7 km (4.3 mi) away and Thiruvananthapuram Central Railway Station is 4 km (2.5 mi) away.

Pattom is home to a significant Christian community. Cardinal Baselios Cleemis, the head of the Syro-Malankara Catholic Church, served as the archbishop of St. Mary's Cathedral in Pattom prior to being elevated to the College of Cardinals.

== Notable people ==
- Pattom A. Thanu Pillai – former chief minister of Kerala from 1960 to 1962
- Pattom Sadan – film actor

== Picture gallery ==
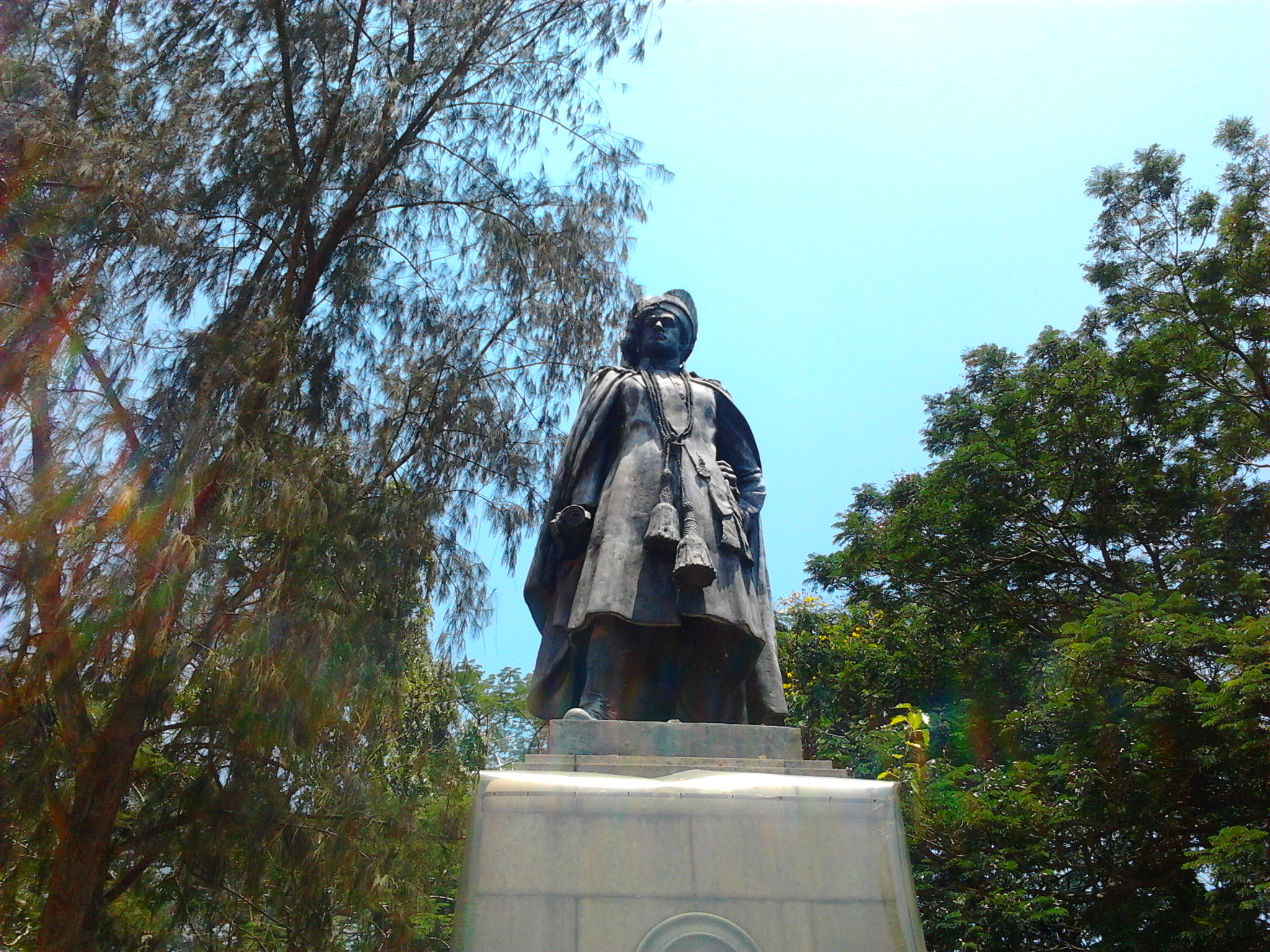
Statue of Sree Chithira Thirunal Maharaja at Pattom Thanupilla Park

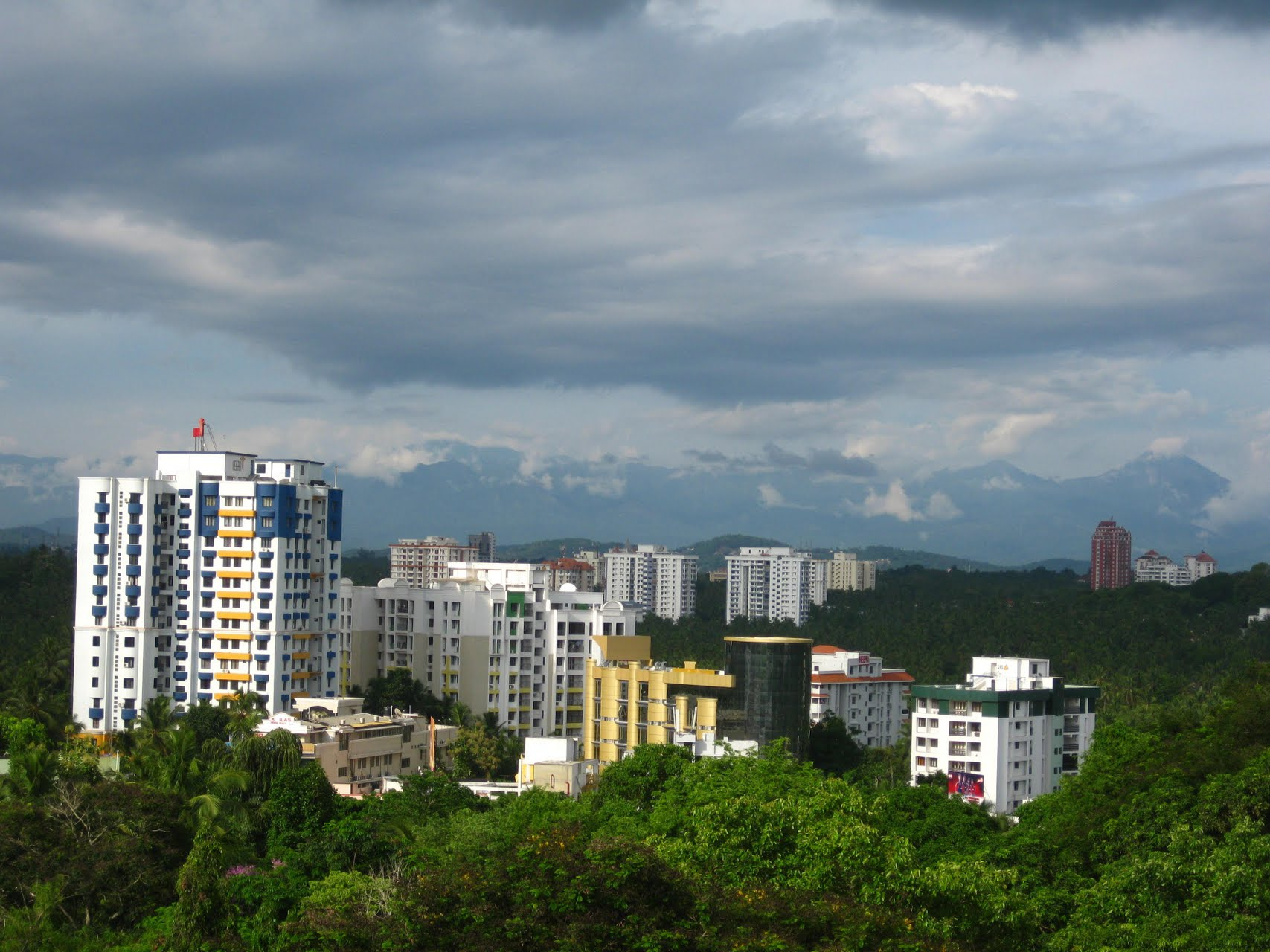
Skyline

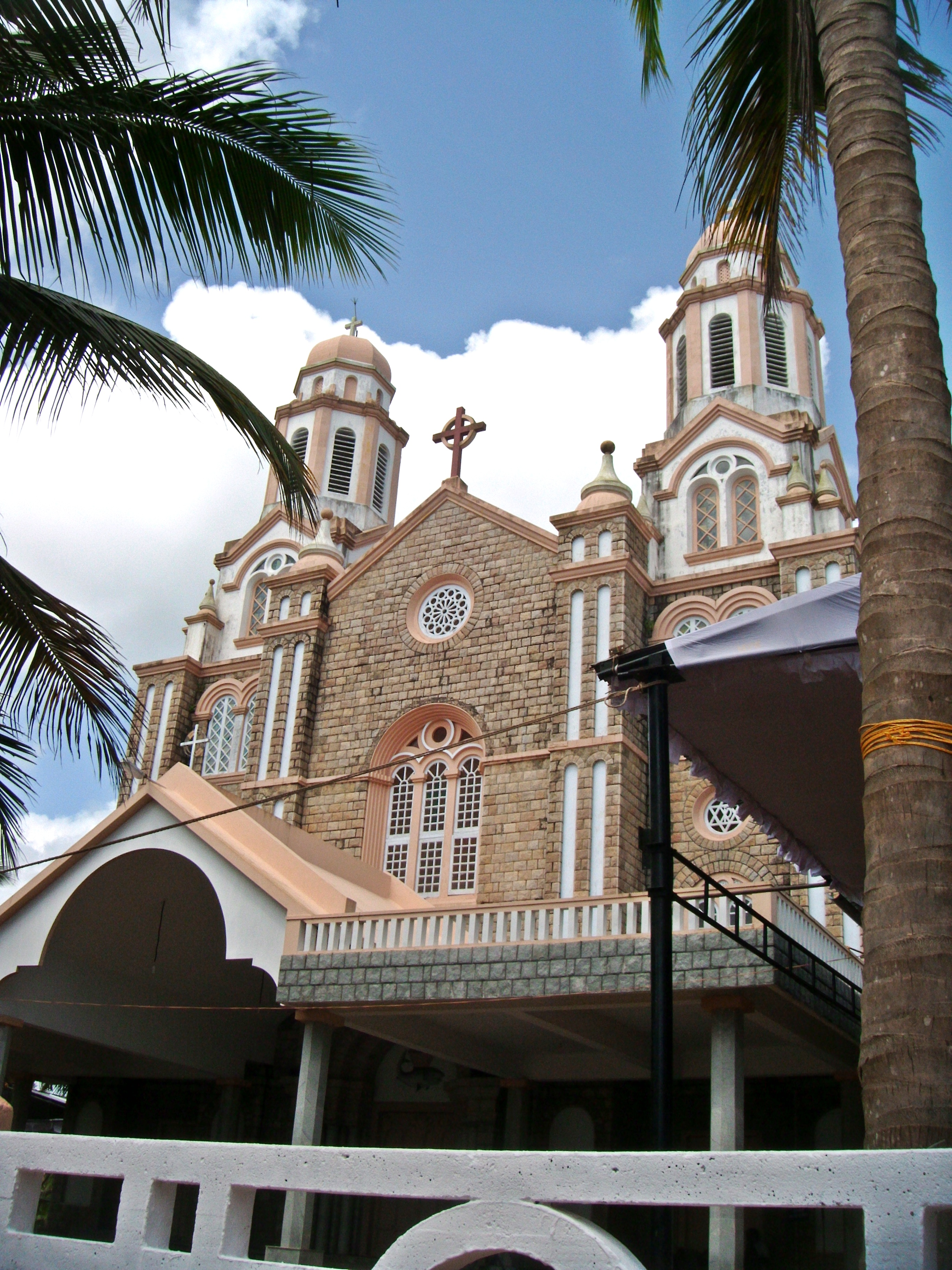
St. Mary's Cathedral

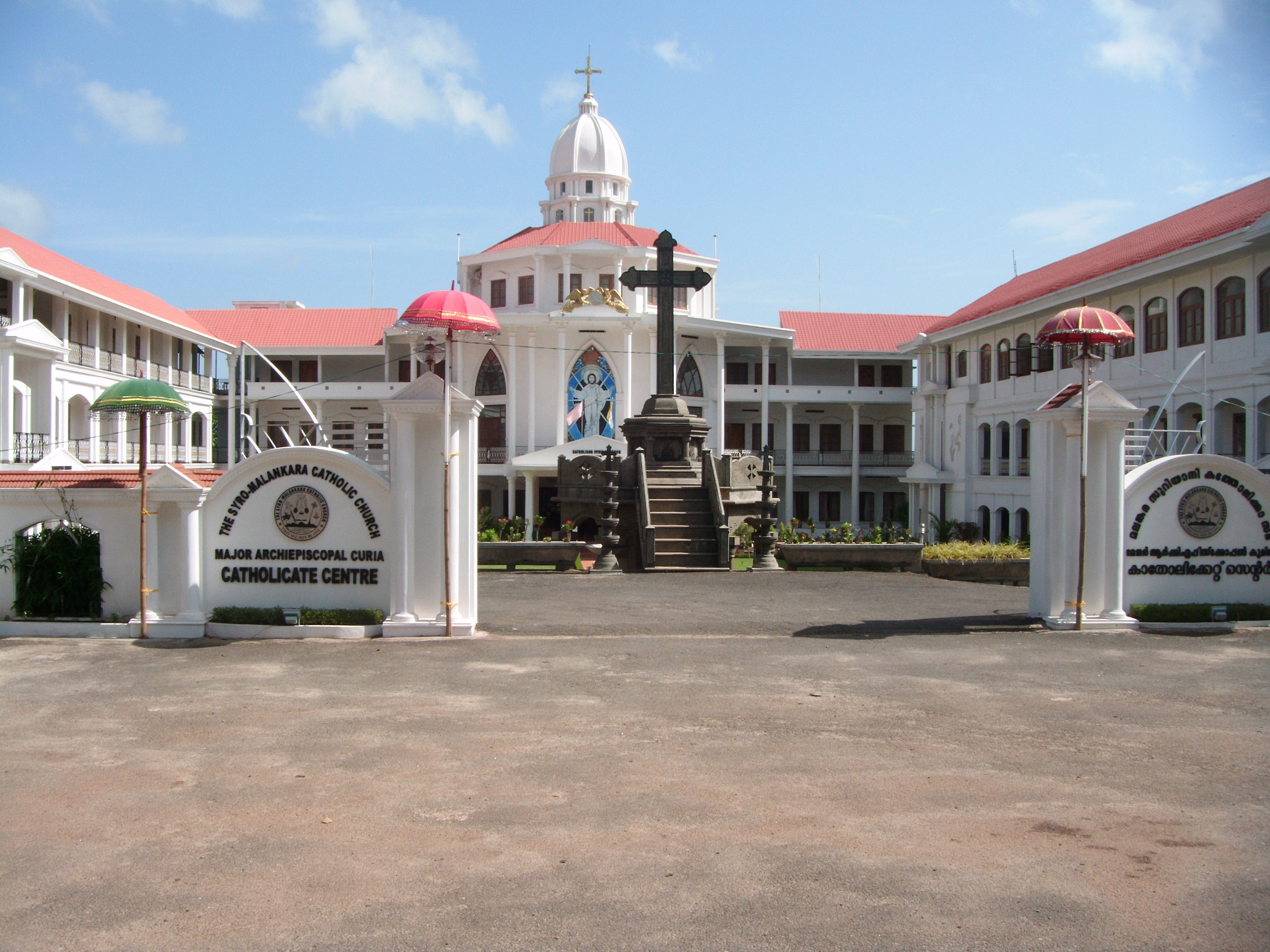
St. Mary's Cathedral
