= Syro-Malankara Catholic Church =

Eastern Catholic church

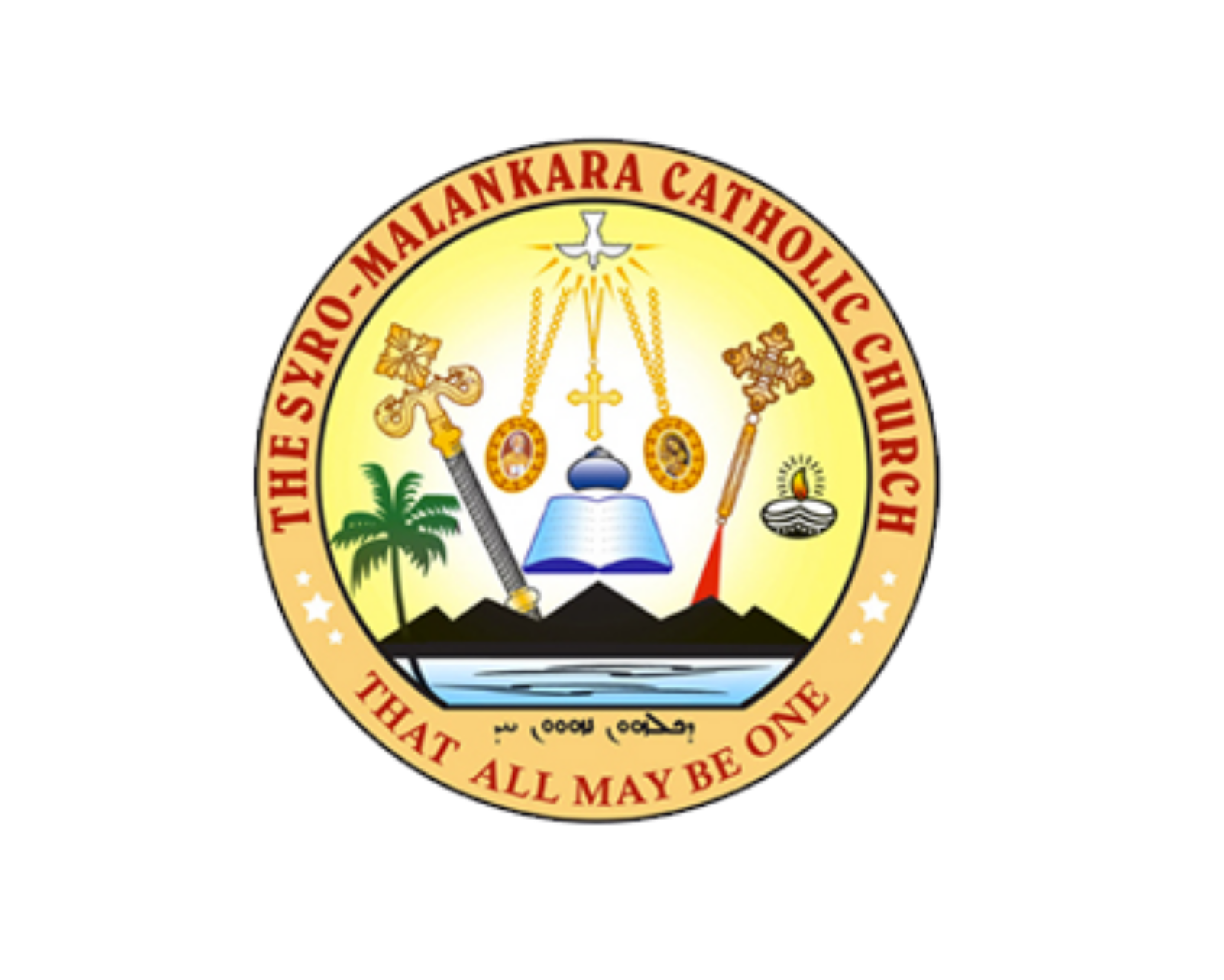
Syro-Malankara Catholic Church
- മലങ്കര സുറിയാനി കത്തോലിക്ക സഭ ܥܕܬܐ ܣܝܪܝܢܝܬܐ ܡܠܢܟܪܝܬܐ ܟܬܘܠܝܩܝܬܐ
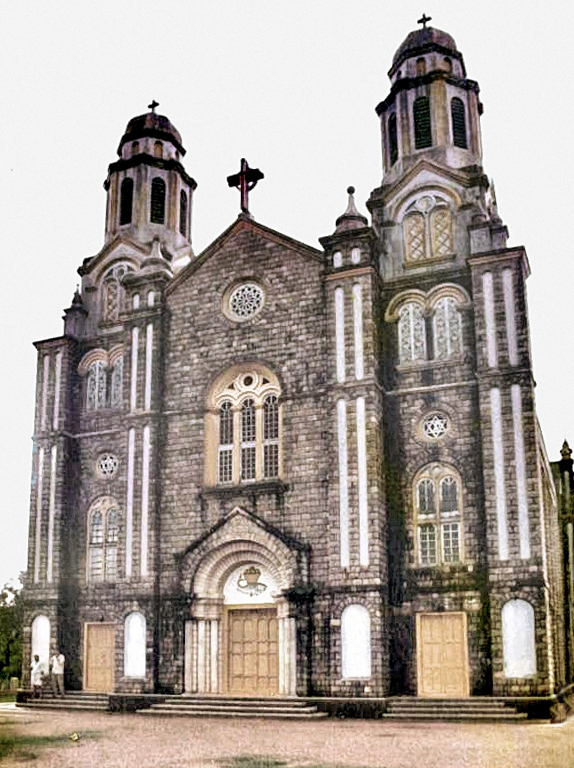
- Old image of St. Mary's Cathedral, Pattom, Trivandrum
- Type: Particular church (sui iuris)
- Classification: Christian
- Orientation: Eastern Catholic; Syriac
- Scripture: Peshitta
- Theology: Catholic theology
- Polity: Episcopal polity
- Pope: Leo XIV
- Major Archbishop: Baselios Cleemis
- Parishes: 1096
- Liturgy: West Syriac Rite; (Malankara Rite)
- Headquarters: St. Mary's Cathedral, Pattom, Kerala, India
- Founder: a. Jesus according to Catholic sacred tradition; b. Apostle Thomas through apostolic succession, by tradition; c. Geevarghese Ivanios (1930)
- Origin: 1930–1932
- Separated from: Malankara Jacobite Syrian Church and Malankara Orthodox Syrian Church
- Branched from: Saint Thomas Christians
- Members: 458,015
- Other names: Malankara Syrian Catholic Church; Syro-Malankara Rite Catholic Church
- Official website: malankaracatholicchurch.in

The Syro-Malankara Catholic Church, also known as the Malankara Syrian Catholic Church, is an Eastern Catholic sui iuris particular church that employs the West Syriac Rite and is in full communion with the worldwide Catholic Church, possessing self-governance under the Code of Canons of the Eastern Churches. It is one of the major archiepiscopal churches of the Catholic Church and is headed by Major Archbishop Mor Baselios Cardinal Cleemis Catholicos of the Major Archdiocese of Trivandrum based in Kerala, India. With more than 1096 parishes, it is one of India's largest Christian groupings.

The Syro-Malankara Church traces its origins to the missions of Thomas the Apostle in the 1st century. After the Coonan Cross Oath in 1653, the Puthenkūttukār (Malankara Faction) split from communion with the Catholic Church, and supported Archdeacon Thoma I in resisting the authority of the Latin Catholic Portuguese Padroado. The Puthenkūttukār entered into communion with the Syriac Orthodox Church and Thoma I was consecrated as bishop by Gregorios Abdul Jaleel. After this, the Malankara Church began to gradually adopt the West Syriac Rite liturgy from the Syriac Orthodox Church.

Geevarghese Ivanios, a bishop of the Malankara Orthodox Syrian Church, began a movement in the Malankara Church to reunite with Rome in the 1920s. Ivanios started negotiations with the Holy See in 1926 and two bishops including Ivanios, a priest, a deacon and a layman were received into the Catholic Church together in 1930.

The Malankara Syrian Catholic Church was formed on 20 September 1930 under the leadership of Ivanios, the first Archbishop of the church.

By 1950, there were some 65,588 faithful, and in 1970, 183,490. There are now over 400,000 faithful in over 12 dioceses in India and across the world.

The Syro-Malankara Catholic Church is one of two Eastern Catholic Churches in India, the other being the Syro-Malabar Catholic Church, which represents the faction of Pazhayakuttukar, which remained in full communion with Rome after the Coonan Cross Oath and employs the East Syriac Rite.

== History ==
=== Pre-Coonan Cross Oath ===
The St. Thomas Christians, also known as Nasranis, are an ancient Christian community in India with origins traditionally traced to the evangelistic activities of Thomas the Apostle in the 1st century AD. Situated primarily in the southwestern state of Kerala, the St. Thomas Christians developed a unique identity blending elements of Indian and Syriac Christian traditions. They maintained a hierarchical ecclesiastical structure, often aligning with the East Syriac Church (under the Church of the East) and later the Chaldean Catholic Church. The community largely followed Eastern Christian liturgy, practiced Syriac liturgical traditions, and were in communion with the Patriarch of the East based in Persia.

The arrival of Portuguese explorers in India in the late 15th century marked the beginning of significant European influence on the St. Thomas Christians. The Portuguese sought to bring the Indian Christians into conformity with the Latin Church and asserted their religious and administrative control through the establishment of the Diocese of Goa. This led to tensions, as the Portuguese pressured the community to abandon Eastern practices and adopt Latinized customs, culminating in the Synod of Diamper in 1599, which formally placed the St. Thomas Christians under the jurisdiction of the Catholic Archbishopric of Goa and imposed Latin rites and customs. These measures sparked resistance among the St. Thomas Christians, who sought to preserve their traditions and ecclesiastical autonomy. By the mid-17th century, these grievances intensified, setting the stage for the historic Coonan Cross Oath.

A diagram showing the history of the divisions among the Saint Thomas Christians.

=== Coonan Cross Oath ===
A protest took place in 1653 with the Coonan Cross Oath (Oath of the bent cross). Under the leadership of Archdeacon Thomas, the Thomas Christians publicly took an oath stating that they would not obey the Jesuit Bishops.

Rome sent Carmelites in two groups from the Propagation of the Faith to Malabar headed by Fr. Sebastiani and Fr. Hyacinth. Fr. Sebastiani arrived first in 1655 and began to speak directly with the archdeacon, Thoma I. Fr. Sebastiani, with the help of Portuguese, gained the support of many, especially with the support of Palliveettil Chandy, Kadavil Chandy Kathanar and Vengoor Geevarghese Kathanar. These were the three of the four counselors of Thoma I, who along with Thoma I, had defected with Francisco Garcia Mendes, Archbishop of Cranganore, before the arrival of Sebastaini, according to Jesuit reports.

Between 1661 and 1662, out of the 116 churches, the Carmelites claimed eighty-four churches, leaving the native Thoma I with thirty-two churches. The eighty-four churches and their congregations were the body from which the Syro Malabar Church and Chaldean Syrian Church have descended. The other thirty-two churches and their congregations represented the nucleus from which the Jacobite Syrian Christian Church, Malankara Orthodox Syrian Church, the Malabar Independent Syrian Church (Thozhiyur Church), Malankara Mar Thoma Syrian Church, and Syro-Malankara Catholic Church have originated.

In 1665, Mor Gregorios Abdul Jaleel, a bishop sent by the Syriac Orthodox Patriarch of Antioch, arrived in India. The independent group under the leadership of the archdeacon welcomed him. Though most of the St. Thomas Christians gradually relented in their strong opposition to the Western control, the arrival of Bishop Gregorios of the Syriac Orthodox Church in 1665 marked the beginning of a formal schism among the St. Thomas Christians. Those who accepted the West Syriac liturgical tradition of the Syriac Orthodox Church of Antioch of Gregorios became known as the Puthenkoor. Those who were in the communion of Rome after the Synod of Damper and those who rejoined the Catholic communion from the Puthenkoor church during the Carmelite period, came to be known as the Pazhayakoor.

Both factions continued to use the name "Malankara", the real name of the St. Thomas Christian community for the church.

The remaining Pazhayakoor Christians who remained in communion with Rome came to be known as the Syro-Malabar Church from the 1890s.

=== Post-Coonan Cross Oath ===
The 118th Syriac Orthodox Patriarch of Antioch, Ignatius Abded Aloho II, travelled to Malankara in 1911 and excommunicated Geevarghese Dionysius of Vattasseril. To limit the Patriarch’s involvement in the administration of the Church’s temporal affairs, Fr. P.T. Geevarghese (Ivanios before his consecration as bishop), with the blessing of Dionysius contacted Ignatius Abdul Masih II, the 117th Syriac Orthodox Patriarch of Antioch, who had been excommunicated by the Ottoman government in 1906, and invited him to visit Malankara and to establish an independent Catholicate. Hence, Ignatius Abdul Masih II went to Malankara in 1912 and established the Catholicate in Malankara. This created a split in the church:

- the faction resisting the Patriarch's administrative interference became the Malankara Orthodox Syrian Church, an autocephalous Church under Malankara Metropolitan and the Catholicos;
- the faction supporting the Patriarch's administration became the Malankara Syriac Orthodox Church (known today as the Jacobite Syrian Christian Church).

Baselios Paulose I (1912–1913), the first Catholicos, died after a short period of five months on 13 May 1913; the See remained vacant until 1925.

=== Pre-ecclesial communion ===
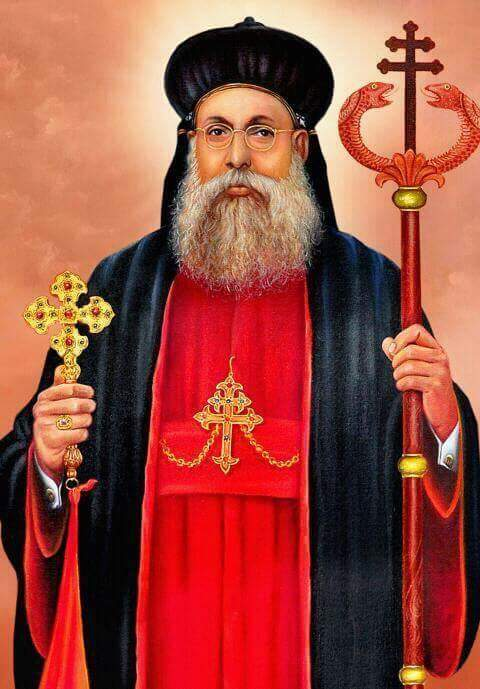
Geevarghese Ivanios

Fr. P.T. Geevarghese established the Bethany Ashram on land donated by his friend E. John Vakeel in Mundanmala, Ranni-Perunadu on 15 August 1919. It served as a centre for spiritual renewal and monastic life, with an additional outreach for orphan care. In 1925, he also established the Bethany Madhom, a convent for women religious, inspired by the Epiphany Sisters of England.

Geevarghese was consecrated as a bishop in the Malankara Orthodox Syrian Church by Catholicos Baselios Geevarghese I on 1 May 1925, taking the name Geevarghese Ivanios. He later advocated for reunification with the Catholic Church.

=== Ecclesial communion and establishment of Syro-Malankara hierarchy ===
The Five Pillars of 1930 Union Event: Ivanios, Jacob Theophilos, John Kuzhinapurath, Alexander, Chacko Kiliyilathu

On 20 September 1930, Ivanios, Bishop Jacob Theophilos, Fr. John Kuzhinapurath OIC, Dn. Alexander OIC, and Chacko Kilileth, a lay man, entered into communion with the Catholic Church. They were received by Bishop Aloysius Maria Benziger, bishop of Quilon, whom Ivanios approached for help and who was deputed by the Holy See to perform the reception. The reception took place in the Quilon bishop’s chapel.

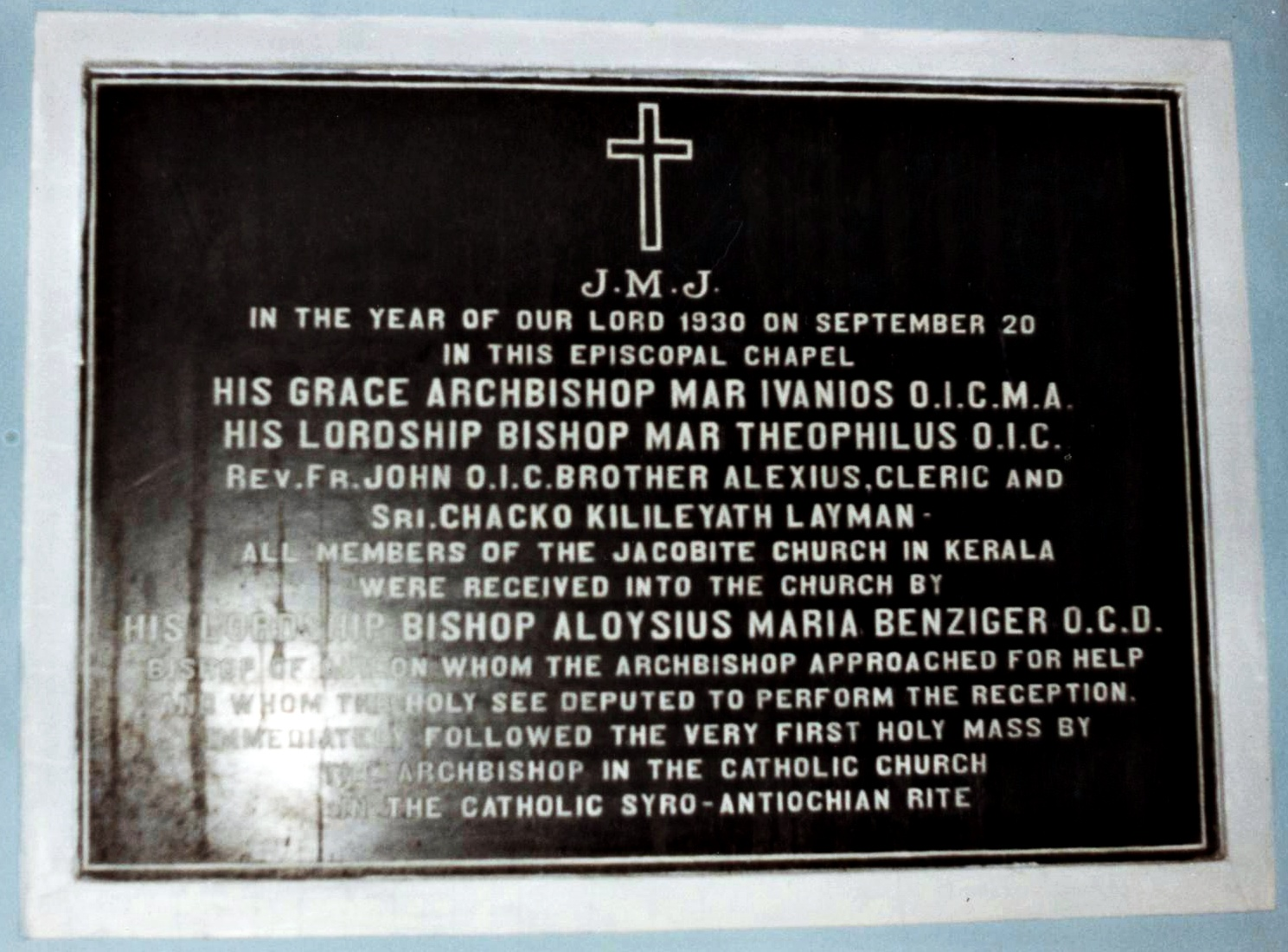
Quilon bishop's chapel, memorial stone to commemorate the founding of the Syro-Malankara rite, 1930

Pope Pius XI, through the Apostolic Constitution Christo Pastorum Principi of 11 June 1932, established the Syro-Malankara Catholic hierarchy for the reunited community and erected the Archeparchy of Thiruvananthapuram with the Eparchy of Tiruvalla as its suffragan.

In 1937, Joseph Severios of the Malankara Orthodox Syrian Church and in 1939, Thomas Dioscoros, the metropolitan of the Knanaya Jacobite Church, joined the Syro-Malankara Catholic Church.

In 1938, the missionary congregation of the Daughters of Mary was founded at Marthandom in Kanyakumari District.

Ivanios consecrated Benedict Gregorios as his auxiliary bishop in 1953.

The Eparchy of Tiruvalla was led by Jacob Theophilos and Joseph Severios. Severios was the administrator of the eparchy until 1950 due to the ill health of Theophilos. In 1950, he was appointed as the archbishop of Tiruvalla. He died on 18 January 1955.

The Holy See appointed Zacharias Athanasios as successor to Severios; his consecration took place in 1954.

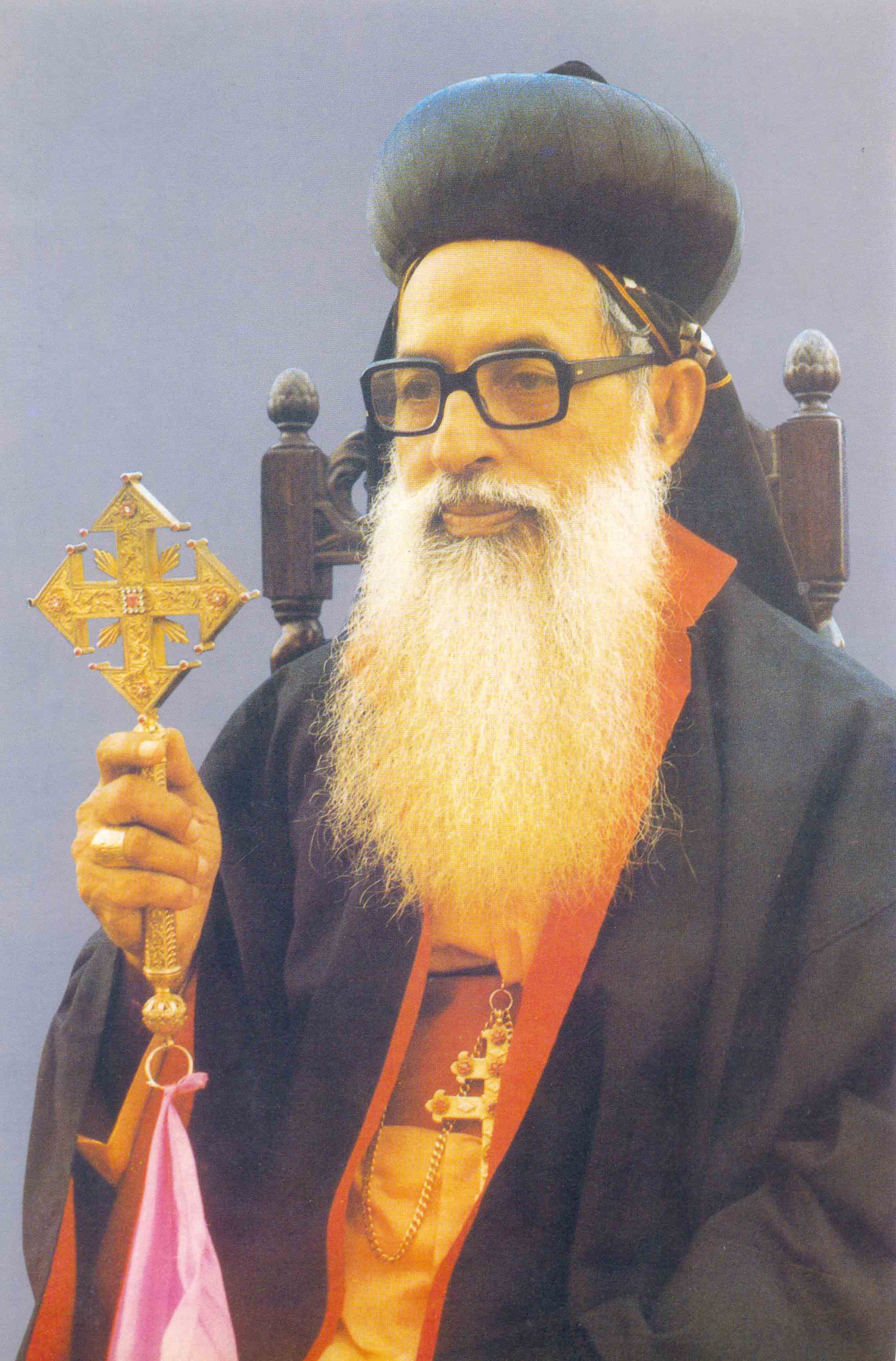
Benedict Gregorios

In 1955, after the death of Ivanios, Benedict Gregorios was enthroned as the metropolitan archbishop of Thiruvananthapuram and the head of the Syro-Malankara Catholic Church.

=== Further Ecclesiastical developments ===
Francis Acharya, a Cistercian monk, came to the Eparchy of Tiruvalla. In 1957, he founded the Kristiya Sanyasa Samaj, Kurisumala Ashram in Vagamon.

In 1958, the territorial boundary of the Eparchy of Tiruvalla was extended north to include the Malabar region of Kerala, the civil districts of Coimbatore and Nilgiris and Karoor Taluk in Tiruchirappally District of Tamil Nadu and districts of Mysore, Mandya, Coorg, Hasan, Chickamangalore, Shimoga and South Kanara of Karnataka State.

Paulos Philoxenos, the metropolitan of the Malabar Independent Syrian Church, was received into the Syro-Malankara Catholic Church on 28 August 1977.

In 1978, through the decree of the Holy See, Isaac Yoohanon was appointed as Bishop of Tiruvalla and the Eparchy of Bathery was erected with Cyril Baselios appointed as its first bishop. In 1979, the Eparchial contemplative monastery, Dhyana Ashram, was founded in the Eparchy of Bathery by Fr. Silvester Kozhimannil.

Syro-Malankara Catholics within India but outside the canonical territorial boundaries of the Church were first organized as Malankara Catholic Associations, and were erected as personal parish communities. A coordinator was appointed to oversee them, in the Council of Hierarchs of the Malankara Catholic Church.

St. Mary’s Malankara Major Seminary, the first local seminary, was inaugurated at Pattom in 1983 and the new building at Nalanchira, Thiruvananthapuram was blessed in 1989.

On 8 February 1986, Pope John Paul II visited St. Mary's Cathedral, Pattom, Thiruvananthapuram.

Geevarghese Timotheos succeeded Yoohanon as the bishop of Tiruvalla. He was consecrated bishop in 1988.

Mor Cyril Baselios, 3rd Metrapolitan Archbishop of the Syro-Malankara Church

Benedict Gregorios died in 1994 and was succeeded by Cyril Baselios, the bishop of Bathery, on 14 December 1995. Geevarghese Divannasios was consecrated Bishop of Bathery in the place of Cyril Baselios on 5 February 1997.

On the request of Cyril Baselios, by an Apostolic Bull dated 16 December 1996, Pope John Paul II erected the Eparchy of Marthandom bifurcating the Metropolitan Eparchy of Thiruvananthapuram. Lawrence Ephrem was appointed as its first bishop. He died after a few months of his enthronement as Bishop of Marthandom, on 8 April 1997.

Thomas Koorilos, was consecrated auxiliary bishop of Tiruvella on 17 July 1997. On 29 June 1998, Yoohanon Chrysostom was consecrated as the bishop of Marthandom and Joshua Ignathios as the auxiliary bishop for the Metropolitan Eparchy of Thiruvananthapuram.

=== Modern era ===
In the 1990s, parishes for the faithful of the Syro-Malankara Catholic Church in the United States of America were being established. Hence, on 18 June 2001, Pope John Paul II nominated the Proto-Syncellus of Bathery, Isaac Thottunkal, auxiliary bishop of Thiruvananthapuram and apostolic visitor for the Syro-Malankara faithful residing in North America and Europe. He was consecrated on 15 August 2001 at Tirumoolapuram, Tiruvalla, and assumed the name Isaac Cleemis.

Bifurcating the Eparchy of Tiruvalla, the Eparchy of Muvattupuzha was erected on 15 January 2003 and Thomas Koorilos was appointed as its first bishop.

On 29 March 2003, Timotheos resigned due to his age, and the Holy See appointed Isaac Cleemis, as the bishop of Tiruvalla. On 5 January 2005, Joseph Thomas was appointed as the auxiliary bishop of Thiruvananthapuram and apostolic visitor to North America and Europe.

By the decree of Baselios, on 1 January 2007, the new Eparchy of Mavelikara was erected and Joshua Ignathios, the auxiliary bishop and protosyncellus of the Major Archdiocese of Thiruvananthapuram, was appointed as its first bishop.

The Second Ordinary Holy Episcopal Synod was convoked on 6–7 December 2006 and it was decided to revive monastic consecration according to the tradition of the Antiochene Church, called Ramban; and Corepiscopo, to honour a number of priests for their meritorious service in the Church.

On 10 February 2005, the Syro-Malankara Catholic Church was raised to the status of a major archiepiscopal Church.

On 18 January 2007, Cyril Baselios died, and was entombed by the side of his predecessors at St. Mary's Cathedral, Pattom, Thiruvananthapuram on 20 January 2007.

Isaac Cleemis was elected the Major Archbishop of the Syro-Malankara Catholic Church through the first Episcopal Synod of election of the Syro-Malankara Catholic Church held on 7–10 February 2007 at the Catholicate Centre, Pattom, Thiruvananthapuram. Pope Benedict XVI confirmed the election on 9 February and it was announced on 10 February at St. Mary's Cathedral, Pattom, Thiruvananthapuram. Baselios Cleemis was enthroned as the Major Archbishop of the Syro-Malankara Catholic Church on 5 March 2007 at St. Mary's Cathedral.

On 7 February 2007, Pope Benedict XVI appointed Fr. Chacko Aerath OIC as the Apostolic Visitor with Episcopal status for the Malankara Catholic faithful residing in the Extraterritorial Regions of the Church within India.

In March 2007, Thomas Koorilos was appointed the Metropolitan Archbishop of the Archieparchy of Tiruvalla. His installation ceremony was held in May 2007 at St. John's Cathedral, Tiruvalla. Cleemis was the main celebrant.

Baselios Cleemis visited Pope Benedict XVI on 28 May 2007 at the Vatican and exchanged ecclesiastical Communion.

In July 2007 Baselios Cleemis declared Ivanios a Servant of God.

In accordance with the provisions of CCEO can. 1063, the Ordinary Tribunal of the Syro-Malankara Catholic Church was constituted on 15 November 2007.

Abraham Julios, was consecrated Bishop of the Eparchy of Muvattupuzha by Baselios Cleemis on 9 February 2008.

Cardinal Leonardo Sandri at St. Mary's Cathedral, Pattom, Thiruvananthapuram

Leonardo Sandri, Cardinal Prefect of Congregation for the Oriental Churches, visited the Syro-Malankara Catholic Church on 10 November 2008 and celebrated the Holy Qurbono. Cardinal Sandri also recognized St. Mary's Pro-Cathedral at Palayam, Thiruvananthapuram, as a Basilica. Cleemis dedicated St. Mary, Queen of Peace Basilica on 7 December 2008.

Cleemis erected the Eparchies of Pathanamthitta in Kerala and Puthur in the State of Karnataka.

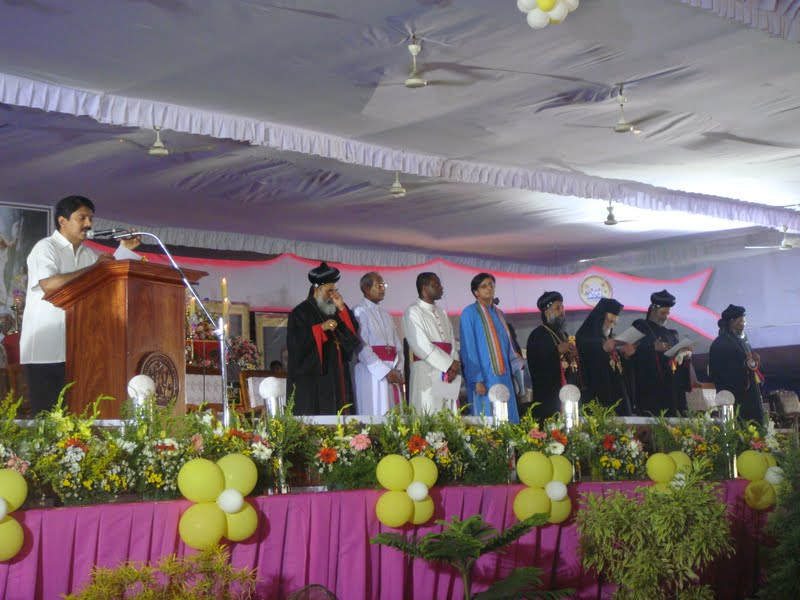
The public meeting after the Episcopal Ordination, March 2010

Thomas Naickamparampil was appointed as the first exarch of the Syro-Malankara Catholic Exarchate in the United States by Pope Benedict XVI, with consultation by Cleemis and the Holy Synod of Syro-Malankara Catholic Church, on 14 July 2010. He was ordained bishop and received the name Thomas Eusebius on 21 September 2010 at St. Mary's Malankara Syrian Catholic Cathedral, Thiruvananthapuram. His installation ceremony was on 3 October 2010 at Kellenberg Memorial High School, Uniondale, New York.

Baselios Cleemis was elevated to the College of Cardinals of the Catholic Church by Pope Benedict XVI at the Papal Basilica of Saint Peter in the Vatican on 24 November 2012. As Cardinal-Priest he was assigned the titular church of San Gregorio VII. He is the first bishop of the Syro-Malankara church to become cardinal.

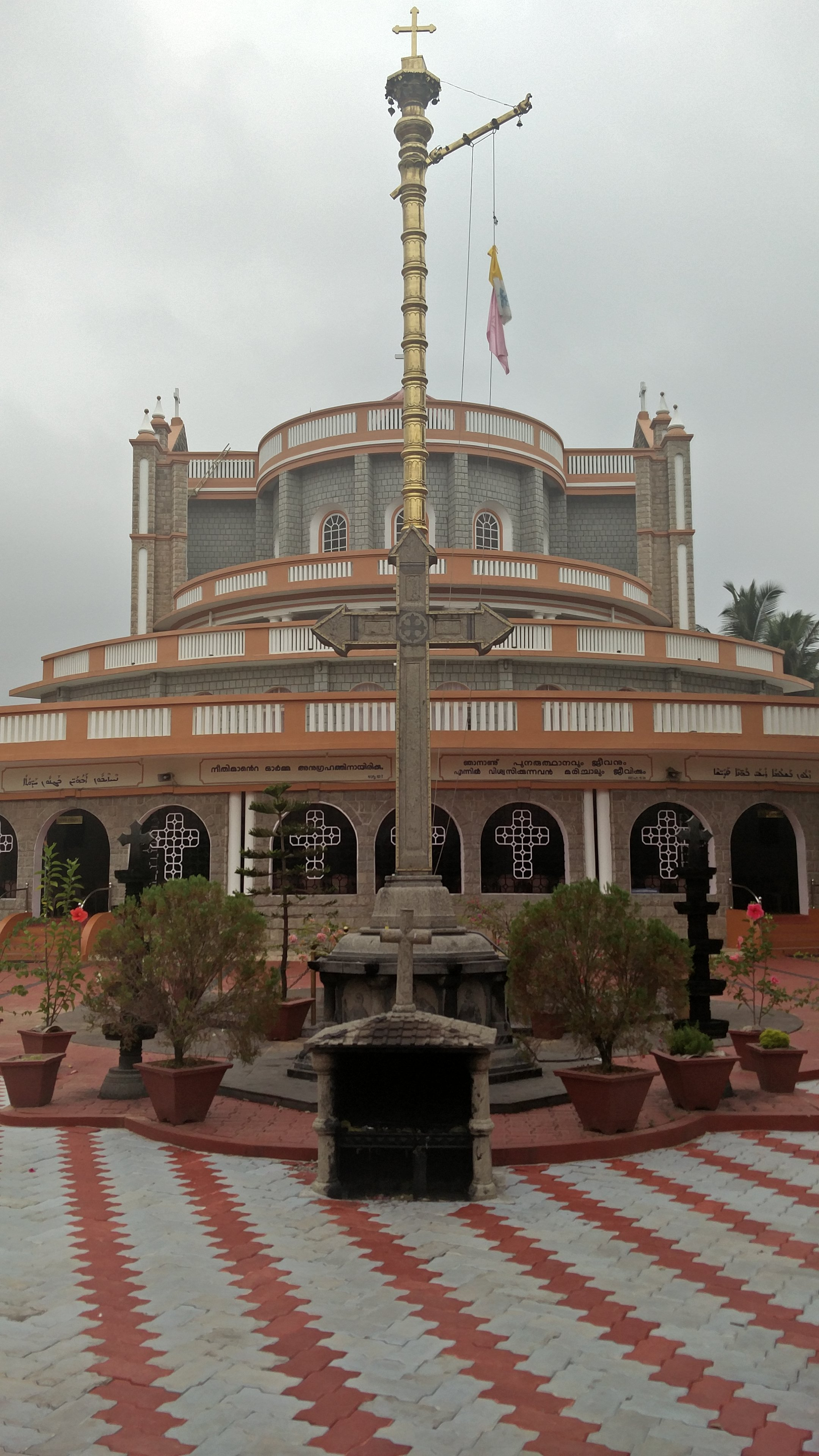
The latest image of St. Mary's Cathedral, Pattom, Thiruvananthapuram

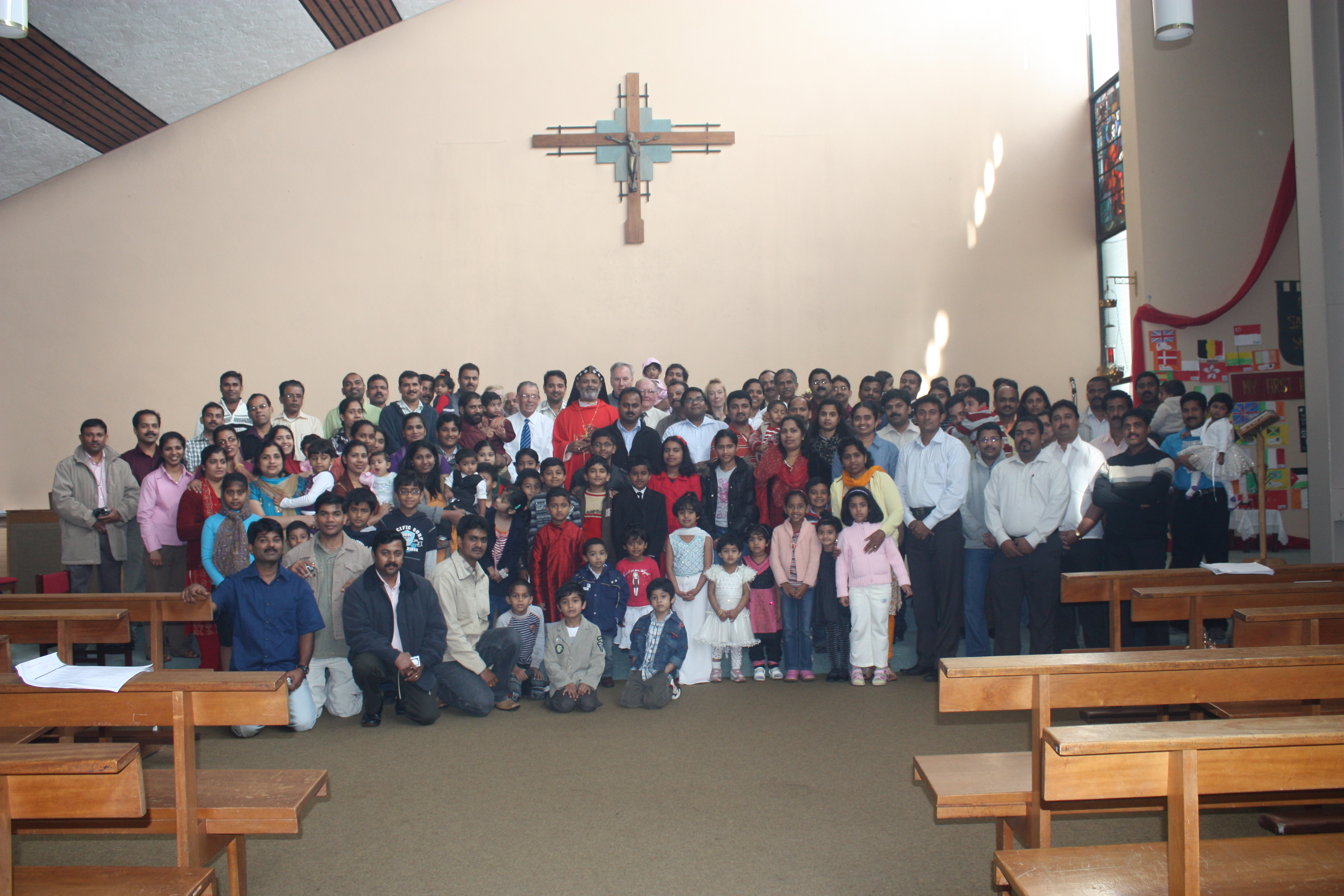
Syro-Malankara Catholics in Ireland with Dr. Joshua Ignathius. (Mavelikara Diocese Bishop)

== Elevation to Major Archiepiscopal Church ==
On 10 February 2005, the Syro-Malankara Catholic Church was raised to the status of a major archiepiscopal Church by the papal document Ab ipso Sancto Thoma, and as such possesses a high level of autonomy under the Code of Canons of the Eastern Churches. Pedro López Quintana, the Apostolic Nuncio in India, read the official declaration at St. Mary's Cathedral, Pattom, Thiruvananthapuram. The Hierarchical Head of the Church became a Major Archbishop who exercises patriarchal powers and governs the Church assisted by the Holy Synod of Bishops of the Church.

On 11 April 2005, the Faculty of Theology of St. Mary’s Malankara Major Seminary became affiliated to the Pontifical Urban University Rome.

The enthronement of the major archbishop as the head of the Syro-Malankara Catholic Church took place on 14 May 2005. The Malankara Major Archiepiscopal Curia started functioning at the St. Mary's Campus, Pattom, Thiruvananthapuram. On 20 May 2005, Cyril Baselios blessed the Curia building.

Baselios constituted the first synod of the Syro-Malankara Catholic Church, convened from 16 to 18 August 2005 at the Major Archiepiscopal Curia, Thiruvananthapuram. It constituted the Permanent Synod and the various Synodal Commissions headed by bishops to take care of various apostolates of the Church. The official bulletin, Malankara, is published from the Major Archiepiscopal Curia, to communicate the Synodal acts of the Syro-Malankara Church.

== Liturgy ==
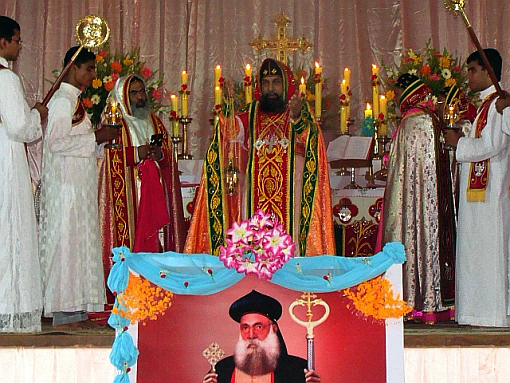
Holy Qurbono in Syro-Malankara Rite

The liturgy of the Syro-Malankara Catholic Church is of the Antiochene Rite, West Syriac in character. The liturgy today is celebrated mostly in vernacular Malayalam, Syriac (liturgically), English, Tamil, and Hindi. The church uses one of several Bible translations into Malayalam.

== Jurisdictions ==
=== Proper Ecclesiastical provinces ===
- Metropolitan Major Archeparchy of Thiruvananthapuram
  - Eparchy of Marthandom
  - Eparchy of Mavelikara
  - Eparchy of Parassala
  - Eparchy of Pathanamthitta
  - Eparchy of St. Ephrem of Khadki
- Metropolitan Archeparchy of Tiruvalla
  - Eparchy of Bathery
  - Eparchy of Muvattupuzha
  - Eparchy of Puthur

=== Personal Jurisdiction directly under the Holy See ===
- Eparchy of St. John Chrysostom of Gurgaon
- Eparchy of St. Mary, Queen of Peace of the United States of America and Canada

=== Apostolic Visitation ===
- Apostolic Visitation of Europe, based in Coventry, UK
- Apostolic Visitation of Oceania, based in Adelaide, Australia

=== Titular See ===
- Titular Episcopal See of Chayal

== Statistics ==
According to the Pontifical yearbook Annuario Pontificio for 2012, the Syro-Malankara Church had approximately 436,870 members.

Dioceses	Members	Bishops	Parishes	Diocesan Priests	Religious Priests	Men Religious	Women Religious	Seminarians
Archeparchy of Thiruvananthapuram	219,437	2	184	131	24	97	578	100
Eparchy of Parassala	22,000	1	104	31	4			
Eparchy of Pathanamthitta	37,500	2	99	64	6	6	110	26
Eparchy of Marthandom	65,715	1	85	40	7	14	178	21
Eparchy of Mavelikara	24,083	1	93	56	7	9	145	23
Archeparchy of Tiruvalla	75,000	1	122	112	25	54	285	37
Eparchy of Bathery	25,000	1	101	77	8	8	274	25
Eparchy of Muvattupuzha	12,435	2	69	41	8	24	82	13
Eparchy of Puttur	2,700	1	32	14	7	8	20	3
Eparchy of the United States and Canada	10,000	1	19	11	1	1	16	4
Eparchy of Gurgaon	10,000	1	34	26	15			
Eparchy of Khadki	10,000	1	29	27	10			
TOTAL	436,870	14	692	546	93	221	1688	252

=== Previous metropolitans ===
Title	Name	Notes
Archbishop	Geevarghese Ivanios	Split from Malankara Orthodox Church
1st Metropolitan of Tiruvalla	Jacob Theophilos	Split from Malankara Orthodox Church
2nd Metropolitan of Tiruvalla	Joseph Severios	Left Malankara Orthodox Church
Bishop of Thirumoolapuram	Thomas Dioscoros	Left Knanaya Syriac Orthodox Church
Archbishop	Benedict Gregorios	Left Malankara Orthodox Church
3rd Metropolitan of Tiruvalla	Zacharias Athanasios	Left Orthodox Church
Titular Bishop of Chayal	Paulos Philoxenos	Left Malabar Independent Syrian Church
4th Metropolitan of Tiruvalla	Isaac Yoohanon
Major Arch Bishop-Catholicos	Cyril Baselios
1st Metropolitan of Marthandom	Lawrence Ephrem
1st Metropolitan of Puttur	Geevarghese Divannasios
5th Metropolitan & 1st Bishop Emeritus of Tiruvalla	Geevarghese Timotheos	Left Malankara Orthodox Church
1st Metropolitan of Gurgaon	Jacob Barnabas

== In the Indian diaspora ==
There are 39 Syro-Malankara communities in North India, including churches at Bangalore, Chennai, Kolkata, Delhi, Mumbai, Pune and Hyderabad. On 26 March 2015, Cleemis and the Holy Synod in consultation with Pope Francis erected two Eparchies to cover all of India. Bishop Barnabas Jacob was appointed bishop of the Delhi-based Eparchy of St. John Chrysostom of Gurgaon. Bishop Anthonios Thomas heads the Apostolic Exarchate of St. Ephrem of Khadki.

== Around the world ==
=== North America ===
The eparchy of the United States of America and Canada was initially established as an apostolic exarchate by Pope Benedict XVI in July 2010. Father Thomas Naickamparampil, then serving as secretary general of the Major Archiepiscopate of the Syro-Malankara Catholic Church, was appointed the first apostolic exarch. He was consecrated as bishop on 21 September 2010 at St. Mary's Malankara Syrian Catholic Cathedral in Pattom, adopting the episcopal name Aboon Thomas Eusebius. His enthronement took place on 3 October 2010 at Kellenberg High School in Uniondale, New York.

On 4 January 2016, Pope Francis elevated the exarchate to the status of an eparchy, expanding its jurisdiction to include Canada. Subsequently, Bishop Philippos Mar Stephanos was appointed as the eparchy's second bishop on 5 August 2017, succeeding Bishop Thomas Mar Eusebius. Bishop Mar Stephanos was installed on 28 October 2017.

As of now, the eparchy oversees 19 parishes and missions, with 14 located in the United States and five in Canada.

=== Europe and Oceania ===
In 2017, Pope Francis appointed Bishop Yoohanon Mar Theodosius as Apostolic Visitor for Syro-Malankara Catholics residing in Europe and Oceania. This appointment was in addition to his role as Bishop of the Major Archiepiscopal Curia of the Syro-Malankara Catholic Church. The Syro-Malankara communities in these regions are present in several countries, including Germany, Austria, Ireland, Italy, Switzerland, the United Kingdom, Australia, and New Zealand.

=== Middle East ===
The Syro-Malankara Catholic Church has a presence in Bahrain, Kuwait, Oman, Qatar, and the United Arab Emirates, with a total of thirteen communities. These communities do not have an organized ecclesiastical jurisdiction and remain under the supervision of the Latin Church's Apostolic Vicariate's of Northern Arabia and Southern Arabia. Qatar is the only country in the region with an officially organized Syro-Malankara parish.

The Syro-Malankara faithful in the Gulf region have been proactive in their online engagement, with early websites being launched to connect the community before the establishment of official church platforms. Currently, most communities in the region maintain their own websites to support pastoral activities.

== Institutions and organizations ==
=== Daughters of Mary ===
The Congregation of the Daughters of Mary is a missionary organization within the Syro-Malankara Catholic Church. Established in 1938 at Marthandam, in the Kanyakumari district, the congregation was founded by Joseph Kuzhinjalil under the guidance of Geevarghese Ivanios. Its mission focuses on evangelization and serving the poor and marginalized.

In 1988, the congregation was granted pontifical right status, signifying its recognition by the Holy See. Today, the Daughters of Mary operates six provinces, serving six eparchies of the Syro-Malankara Catholic Church and 20 dioceses worldwide. The congregation was initially supported by the Syro-Malabar Catholic Church, which contributed religious women to assist in its establishment. The founder, Joseph Kuzhinjalil, was originally a member of the Syro-Malabar Church.

=== Other religious orders and ashrams ===
- Order of the Imitation of Christ, Bethany Ashram
- Order of the Friars Minor Capuchin
- Kristiya Sanyasa Samaj, Kurisumala Ashram
- Franciscan Missionary Brothers
- Malabar Missionary Brothers
- Disciples of Divine Saviour
- Dhyana Ashram
- Chyalpadi Ashram
- Santhi Ashram
- Sisters of the Imitation of Christ, Bethany Madhom
- Holy Spirit Sisters
- Congregation of the Sacred Heart
- Dina Sevana Sabha
- Sisters of the Charity of St. Vincent de Paul
- Snehagiri Missionary Sisters
- Little Sisters of Jesus
- Sisters of John the Baptist
- Salesian Sisters
- Basilian sisters
- Franciscan Missionaries of Mary
- Adoration monastery of Mount Thabor
- Gathsemene Samarpitha Satsangham
- Little Servants of Divine Providence
- Sisters of Charity
- Fervent Daughters of the Sacred Heart of Jesus

=== Seminaries ===
==== Major seminary ====
- St. Mary’s Malankara Major Seminary, Thiruvananthapuram

==== Minor seminaries ====
- Bethany Vedavijnana Peetham, Pune
- St. Aloysius Seminary, Thiruvananthapuram
- Infant Mary's Minor Seminary, Thiruvalla
- St. Thomas Minor Seminary, Gurukulam, Bathery
- St. Ephraem's Minor Seminary, Marthandom
- Gurusannidhi Minor Seminary, Muvattupuzha
- Ivanios Minor Seminary, Mavelikkara
- Gregorios Malankara Syrian Catholic Seminary, New York
- St. Thomas Minor Seminary, Pathanamthitta
- Girideepam Minor Seminary, Diocese of St. John Chrysostom, Gurgaon, New Delhi
- Nirmal Hriday Minor Seminary, Pune

=== Educational institutions ===
The Malankara Catholic Educational Society manages various ecclesiastical, charitable, and educational institutions. Baselios Cleemis is the president and Samuel Irenios the vice-chairman of Malankara Catholic Educational Society.

==== Colleges ====
===== Kerala =====
- Ivanios College, Thiruvananthapuram
- St. John's College, Anchal
- Mar Theophilos Training College
- Pazhassi Raja College, Pulpally, Bathery
- Mar Severios College of Teacher Education, Chengaroor, Thiruvalla
- St. Joseph's College of Information Technology and Management, Thiruvalla
- St. John's Parallel College, Thiruvalla
- Mar Baselios College of Education, Bathery
- Mar Ivanios College of Education, Kunthoor, Karnataka
- Girideepam Institute of Advanced Learning, Kottayam
- Bethany Junior College, Noojibalthila, Bathery

===== Tamil Nadu =====
- Mar Gregorios College of Arts and Science, Chennai
- Malankara Catholic College, Mariagiri, Marthandom
- Bethany College, Nalanchira, Thiruvananthapuram
- Bethany Navajeevan College of Education, Vencode, Marthandom
- Mar Chrysostom College of Education, Kirathur, Marthandom
- Kanyakumari Community College, Mariagiri, Marthandom

===== Other Indian states =====
- Jnanodaya Bethany PU Science College, Nellyadi
- Nirmal Bathany Junior College, Kalewadi, Pune

==== Professional and technical institutes ====
===== Medical and health sciences =====
- Pushpagiri Medical College, Thiruvalla
- Pushpagiri College of Pharmacy, Thiruvalla
- Pushpagiri College of Nursing, Thiruvalla
- Pushpagiri College of Dental Sciences, Thiruvalla
- Bethany Navajeevan College of Nursing, Borsi, Durg, Bhilai
- St.Joseph's College of Nursing, Anchal
- Bethany Navajeevan College of Physiotherapy, Nalanchira, Thiruvananthapuram

===== Engineering and technology =====
- Mar Baselios College of Engineering and Technology, Thiruvananthapuram
- Mar Baselios Institute of Technology, Anchal
- Mar Ephraem College of Engineering, Marthandom

===== Advanced studies and research =====
- St. Ephrem Ecumenical Research Institute, Kottayam
- Mar Athanasios College for Advanced Studies, Tiruvalla

=== Youth and lay organizations ===
==== Malankara Catholic Youth Movement ====
The Malankara Catholic Youth Movement (MCYM) is the official youth organization of the Syro-Malankara Catholic Church. It originated in Kerala during the late 1960s. While individual youth groups existed at the parish level earlier, the development of a unified diocesan structure occurred later.

The movement aims to foster spiritual growth, leadership, and community engagement among young members of the Church. MCYM has expanded its presence across Kerala, other Indian states, and internationally.

MCYM branches in Kerala include the Major Archieparchy of Thiruvananthapuram, the Archieparchy of Thiruvalla, and the Eparchies of Bathery, Muvattupuzha, Mavelikkara, and Pathanamthitta. In Tamil Nadu, the movement serves the Eparchy of Marthandam, while in Karnataka, it operates within the Eparchy of Puttur. In North India, it functions under the Apostolic Visitation for Malankara Syrian Catholic Churches (MCCETR – New Delhi). Internationally, MCYM serves the Syro-Malankara Catholic Eparchy of the United States and Canada, headquartered in Elmont, New York, through the Malankara Catholic Youth Movement of North America (MCYM-NA).

==== Malankara Catholic Association ====
Founded in 1989, the Malankara Catholic Association is the official organization for the lay faithful of the Syro-Malankara Catholic Church. Its activities are aimed at fostering lay participation in the Church's mission and supporting the spiritual and social needs of the community.

The association functions across several dioceses, including the Thiruvananthapuram, Thiruvalla, Bathery, Muvattupuzha, and Marthandam eparchies, as well as in the United States and Canada. Baselios Cleemis serves as its patron.

== Official name ==
The official name of the church is "Syro-Malankara Catholic Church". The name of the church as translated from Malayalam/Syriac is Malankara Syrian Catholic Church, and this is the name used colloquially in India. It should also be noted that this name is largely due to Latin influence (similar to Syro-Malabar), with the Latin Church even referring to the Malankara Orthodox Syrian Church as the "Syro-Malankara Orthodox Church".

== See also ==
- All India Catholic Union
- Churches of Kerala
- List of Major Archbishops of Trivandrum
- Sacred Heart Catholic Church, Mylapra, Pathanamthitta
- Saint Thomas Anglicans
- St. Mary's Higher Secondary School, Pattom, Thiruvananthapuram
- List of Syro-Malankara Catholics
