= Geevarghese Ivanios =

Indian Metropolitan Archbishop (1882–1953)

Venerable Ivanios Geevarghese Panikkervettil OIC
- Metropolitan Archbishop
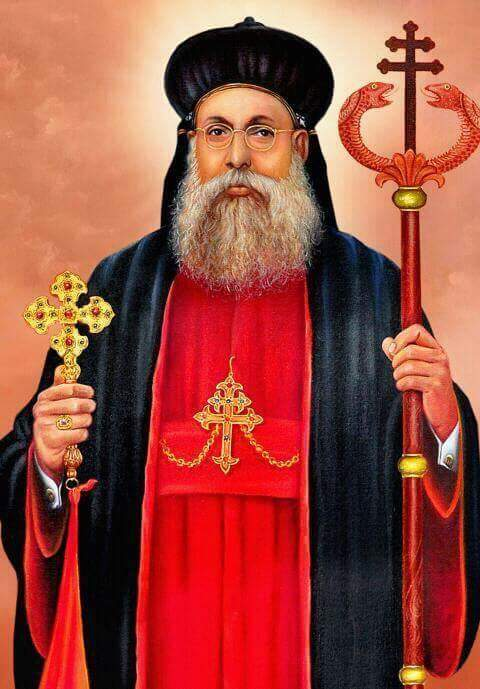
- Church: Syro-Malankara Catholic Church
- See: Syro-Malankara Catholic Major Archeparchy of Trivandrum
- Installed: 11 June 1932
- Term ended: 15 July 1953
- Successor: Aboun Mor Benedict Gregorios Thangalathil OIC
- Previous post: Metropolitan Archbishop of Bethany Ashram of Malankara Orthodox Syrian Church

Orders
- Ordination: 15 September 1908 by Dionysius of Vattasseril
- Consecration: 1 May 1925 by Baselios Geevarghese I

Personal details
- Born: P. T Geevarghese; 21 September 1882 Mavelikkara, Kerala
- Died: 15 July 1953 (aged 70) Thiruvananthapuram, Kerala
- Buried: St. Mary's Malankara Syrian Catholic Cathedral

Panikkervettil Thomas Panicker Geevarghese (21 September 1882 – 15 July 1953), known formally as Geevarghese Mar Ivanios, was the first metropolitan archbishop and founder of the Syro-Malankara Catholic Church. He was a key figure in the Malankara Reunion Movement, which sought to reunite the Malankara Church with the Catholic Church, culminating in his joining the Catholic Church in 1930 along with a group of followers.

Mar Ivanios was instrumental in founding the Bethany Ashram and played a vital role in the establishment of the Syro-Malankara Catholic hierarchy, becoming the first bishop of the Archdiocese of Trivandrum in 1932. He also served as the principal of the Kottayam M.D Seminary High School and as a professor at Serampore College. Geevarghese established about 50 schools, including one 'A' grade college named Mar Ivanios College.

He is a candidate for sainthood in the Catholic Church, having been declared a Servant of God by Cardinal Baselios Cleemis Thottungal in 2007 and Venerable by Pope Francis in 2024.

== Early life ==
P. T. Geevarghese was born on 21 September 1882, in Mavelikkara, Kerala, India, to Thomas Panicker and Annamma Panicker.

Geevarghese was a member of the Panickervettil family, an aristocratic lineage in Mavelikkara, which was part of the princely state of Travancore, now located in the Alappuzha district of Kerala. The family was recognized with the title of "Mylitta Panicker" by the rulers of Travancore.

Geevarghese received his early education at Protestant and government schools. In 1897, he attended M. D. Seminary High School in Kottayam, and later pursued higher studies at Serampore College and Madras Christian College. He completed his matriculation in 1899, after receiving minor clerical orders on 20 September 1898.

== Career ==
=== 1900–1907: Deacon ===
He was ordained a deacon on 9 January 1900 by Pulikkottil Dionysius, the then Malankara Metropolitan of the Malankara Orthodox Syrian Church. Following his ordination, he pursued further studies at CMS College, and later obtained a bachelor's degree in economics and Indian history from Madras Christian College. In 1907, he completed his Master's degree (MA) with distinction from the same institution. Upon returning from Madras, he was appointed principal of M.D. Seminary High School, his alma mater. During his tenure, he played a significant role in various initiatives aimed at renewing the Malankara Church. He organized basic church communities and initiated Bible conventions, earning him the popular title "Koodhasa Shemmashan" (Deacon of Sacraments).

=== 1908–1912: Priestly life ===
On 15 September 1908, he was ordained to the priesthood as P.T. Geevarghese by Mar Dionysius of Vattasseril, the Malankara Metropolitan of the Malankara Orthodox Church. Geevarghese became widely known as "M.A. Achan", as he was the first priest in Malankara with a Master's degree. He was a key figure in the efforts to establish hierarchical autonomy for the Malankara Church, which led to the erection of the Catholicate on 5 September 1912. This event resulted in a division within the Malankara Church, with one faction led by Malankara Metropolitan Vattasseril Dionysius (the Bishop's party) and the other by the Antiochian Jacobite Patriarch (the Bava party). Geevarghese was aligned with the Bishop's party.

=== 1912-1925: Professorship in Serampore; Bethany Ashram, Bethany Madham ===
In 1912, Mar Dionysius of Vattasseril received an invitation to attend a conference in Calcutta. He chose Geevarghese to accompany him to the event. During the conference, they met Dr. Howels, the principal of Serampore College, who requested that the Metropolitan allow Geevarghese to serve as a professor at the college. With the Metropolitan's permission, Geevarghese accepted the position, using the opportunity to contribute to the education of Malankara youth. Approximately 20 young people from Kerala traveled to Calcutta for higher education as a result of this initiative.

While at Serampore, Geevarghese found more time for prayer and contemplation. He became influenced by the writings of Basil of Caesarea on sanyasa (monasticism), which played a significant role in shaping his vision. Additionally, visits to Mahatma Gandhi's Sabarmati Ashram and Rabindranath Tagore's Santiniketan provided him with a new perspective on Indian monasticism. These experiences led Geevarghese to consider establishing an order of missionaries dedicated to evangelization in India. Gradually, his residence at Serampore, along with his followers, evolved into an Ashram (monastery), where they adopted a form of religious life based on the monastic rules of St. Basil, adapted to Indian culture. Following this decision, Geevarghese resigned from his position at Serampore College.

After returning from Calcutta, Geevarghese sought a location to establish an ashram. A friend, E. John Vakeel, donated 100 acres (400,000 m^{2}) of land at Mundanmala, Ranni-Perunadu, Kerala, at the confluence of the Pamba and Kakkatt rivers. The land was initially covered with dense, thorny vegetation. Geevarghese and his followers built a small thatched hut from tree branches and bamboo, marking the establishment of the first ashram in Malankara on 15 August 1919. After prayerful reflection, Geevarghese named the ashram "Bethany," finding the name appropriate for a religious order that emphasized both contemplation and action. Over time, the Bethany Ashram became a site for pilgrimage and spiritual retreats, particularly during Passion Week. Geevarghese envisioned the ashram as a place of refuge for the poor and marginalized, and alongside it, he established a home for orphans.

While at Serampore, Geevarghese also contemplated the empowerment of Syrian Christian women through education. To advance this goal, he initiated the education and training of selected young girls with assistance from the Epiphany Sisters of England, who were working in Serampore. In 1925, he founded the Bethany Madom (literally "Bethany Great House" or convent) as a religious institution for women.

=== 1925–1930: Bishop of Bethany; Ecclesial communion ===
The "Five Pillars" of the Malankara Reunion Movement: Geevarghese, Mar Theophilos, John Kuzhinapurath, Alexander, and Chacko Kiliyilathu

Geevarghese was ordained as the Bishop of Bethany by the Malankara Synod and consecrated as a bishop of the Malankara Orthodox Syrian Church by Baselios Geevarghese I on 1 May 1925, adopting the name Geevarghese Ivanios. On 20 September 1930, Mar Theophilos, John Kuzhinapurath, Alexander Attupurath, and Chacko Kiliyileth made a Catholic profession of faith before Aloysius Maria Benziger, the Bishop of Kollam. Many members of the Bethany orders also entered into full communion with the Catholic Church, leading to the formation of the Syro-Malankara Catholic Church.

=== 1932: Establishment of the Syro-Malankara Catholic hierarchy ===
In 1932, Geevarghese traveled to Rome in response to letters from the Vatican, where he met Pope Pius XI and received the pallium. He also attended the thirty-second Eucharistic Congress in Dublin, Ireland, where he met G. K. Chesterton, who remarked on Geevarghese's role in bringing his community into the Roman Communion.

The dignified Indian gentleman, who represented this far off triumph in the Orient, had changed his neighbours by bringing them to the Roman Communion.

— G. K. Chesterton

Following his return from Rome, Geevarghese worked to establish the Syro-Malankara Catholic Church's infrastructure. On 11 June 1932, Pope Pius XI formally established the Malankara Catholic hierarchy through the apostolic constitution Cristo pastorum principi.

=== 1933–1951: Ecumenical endeavours; Silver Jubilee ===
Geevarghese sent missionaries to various regions, including receiving clergy from the Syro-Malabar Catholic Church. Among them was Joseph Kuzhinjalil, the founder of the Daughters of Mary, who was appointed to work in the southern regions. Under Geevarghese's leadership, about 75 priests from different Malankara denominations joined the Syro-Malankara Catholic Church, and approximately 150 parishes, including mission stations, were established. Notably, a significant number of Hindus, particularly from the Nadar community in Kanyakumari, Tamil Nadu, also joined the church.

According to Mar Ivanios, education is the best investment in human potential which brings about high dividends. Ivanios and those who followed him understood the importance of this high dividend-investment and used it to uplift the community in a changing world.

— Francis A. Samuel, Ph.D, Public School Monitor

Geevarghese established approximately 50 schools and founded Mar Ivanios College, an 'A' grade institution. In 1948, the University of San Francisco awarded him an Honorary Doctor of Laws (LL.D.) degree. During his lifetime, he visited prominent figures such as U.S. President Harry S. Truman, and George Bernard Shaw.

In 1951, the Silver Jubilee of Geevarghese's episcopal ordination was celebrated, during which Pope Pius XII sent a letter acknowledging the reconciliation efforts led by Geevarghese.

== Death ==
Geevarghese died on 15 July 1953, at the age of 70 after a prolonged illness. Following his death, his remains were placed on the episcopal throne of St. Mary's Pro-Cathedral in accordance with the customs of both the Orthodox Church and the Syro-Malankara Catholic Church. He was dressed in his episcopal robes, with his pastoral staff and cross in hand.

On the morning of the funeral, a solemn procession transported his remains from St. Mary's Pro-Cathedral to the crypt of the incomplete new cathedral. The procession was attended by thousands, including many who had joined the Catholic Church under his leadership. The Archbishop was buried in a seated position in the main niche of the cathedral crypt, making him the first interred in the cathedral he had initiated.

== Legacy ==
In 1999, Mar Ivanios College became the first institution affiliated with the University of Kerala to receive accreditation from the National Assessment and Accreditation Council.

The Malankara Catholic Youth Movement holds memorial meetings at Geevarghese's tomb on the eve of his commemoration.

=== Beatification process ===
Upon the opening of his cause, Geevarghese was declared a Servant of God on 14 July 2007, one day before the 54th anniversary of his death. The proclamation was delivered by his third successor, Cardinal Baselios Cleemis, at St. Mary's Malankara Syrian Catholic Cathedral, in Pattom. The process for his beatification remains ongoing. On 14 March 2024, Pope Francis recognized Archbishop Geevarghese Mar Ivanios' practice of heroic virtue and conferred upon him the title of venerable.

== See also ==
- Malankara Catholic Youth Movement

Catholic Church titles
| Preceded by None (seat created) | Metropolitan Archbishop of Trivandrum; 1932–1953 | Succeeded by Benedict Gregorios |
