= Mar Ivanios College =

Catholic college in Kerala, India

Coordinates: 8.5502°N 76.9393°E

Mar Ivanios College, Thiruvananthapuram
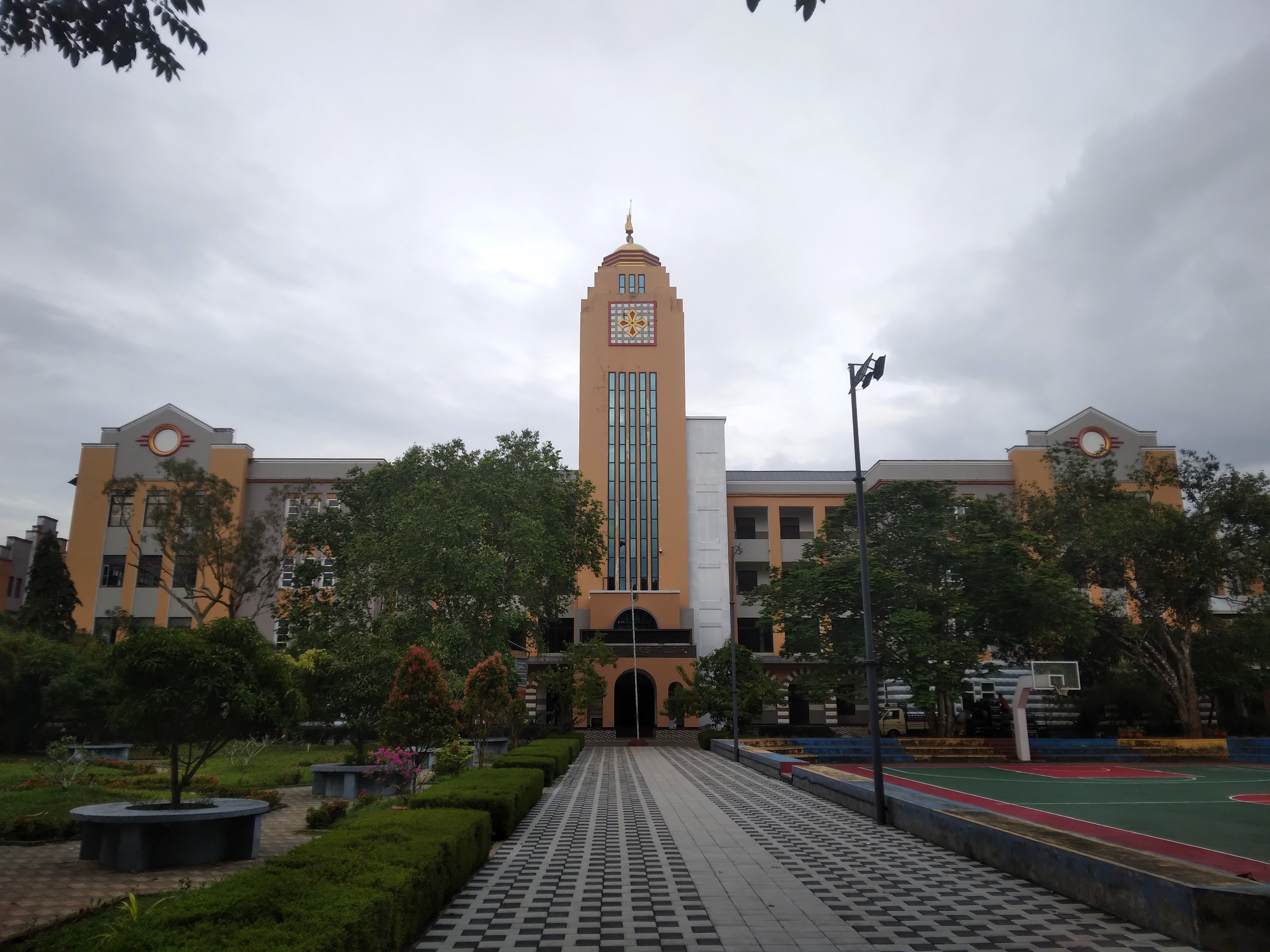
- Other names: Mar Ivanios Malankara Catholic College, Ivanios, MIC
- Motto: Veritas vos liberabit
- Motto in English: The truth shall set you free
- Type: Aided, self-financing, autonomous
- Established: 1949
- Founder: Geevarghese Mar Ivanios
- Affiliations: Kerala University, UGC
- Chairman: Cardinal Cleemis Catholicos
- Principal: Prof. Dr. Meera George
- Students: 2666+
- Undergraduates: 2394+
- Postgraduates: 272+
- Location: Thiruvananthapuram, Kerala, India
- Campus: Urban
- Website: www.marivanioscollege.com

Mar Ivanios College is an autonomous educational institution situated in Thiruvananthapuram, Kerala, India.

The institution is located on a scenic hilltop with a sprawling campus area of hundreds of acres in Bethany Hills, Nalanchira, Thiruvananthapuram. Mar Ivanios College was established in 1949 by Geevarghese Mar Ivanios, the first Archbishop of Thiruvananthapuram. The motto of the college is 'Veritas Vos Liberabit' which means 'Truth shall Liberate You'.

== Rankings ==
College rankings

General – India
- NIRF (Colleges) (2024): 66

The college is ranked 66^{th} among colleges in India by the NIRF in 2024.

== Accreditation ==
The college is the first Institution in the University of Kerala to receive accreditation from the National Assessment and Accreditation Council (NAAC) in 1999. The college was also the first to be re-assessed and re-accredited with 'A' Grade by NAAC in 2004. In 2011 the college was re-assessed by the NAAC Peer team as part of the Third Cycle of re-accreditation process.

Mar Ivanios College became the first private college affiliated to the University of Kerala to receive the status of CPE from the UGC. Upon the recommendation of the University Grants Commission (UGC), the college has been conferred autonomy status by the University of Kerala with effect from 13 June 2014.

== History ==
The college was founded in 1949 as an affiliated college of the then University of Travancore, later on under the Kerala University. The college was the founded by Archbishop Geevarghese Ivanios of the Syro-Malankara Catholic Church, after whom the college was named.

== Courses ==
Mar Ivanios College offers 18 degree courses and 9 post-graduate courses.

Degree courses offered are:

- Bachelor of Science in Physics, Physics with Machine Learning, Chemistry, Mathematics, Computer Science, Botany & Bio Technology, Zoology, Botany and Statistics
- Bachelor of Arts in Economics, English, Journalism and Mass Communication, English, Communicative English, Analytical Economics
- BCom and BCom Accounts and Audit.

Post-graduate courses offered are:

- MSc in Mathematics, Physics, Chemistry, Zoology
- MA in English Language and Literature, Malayalam and Media Studies
- MCom and MTTM.

The Departments of Zoology, Chemistry, Physics, Mathematics, Malayalam, Commerce, Biotechnology, Journalism and English are recognized research centres. It also offers facilities for an Indira Gandhi National Open University (IGNOU) study centre and an International Development Enterprises (IDE) centre.

== Notable alumni ==
Sources:

- Kapil Kapilan (Singer)
- J B Koshy (Justice)
- K. Jayakumar (Poet, Bureaucrat)
- Alexander Jacob (police officer)
- K. Muraleedharan (Politician)
- Jagathi Sreekumar (Actor)
- Anoop Jacob (Politician)
- Jagadish (Actor)
- Vidhu Prathap (Singer)
- Santosh Sivan (Cinematographer/Director)
- Arthana Binu (Actress)
- Sakhi Thomas
- Sruthi Lakshmi
- P. T. Thomas
- Chippy (actress)
- Erickavu N. Sunil (A-grade Mridangam Artist & Author)
- Nazriya Nazim (Actress)
- Abhirami (Actress)
- Mithun Ramesh
- Anarkali Marikar (Actress)
- Moolam Thirunal Rama Varma (Travancore Royal Family)
- G. Venugopal (Singer)
- Priyanka Nair (Actress)
- Manju Pillai (Actress)
- Ravi Vallathol
- Sanju Samson (Cricketer)
- Rajith Kumar
- Shaji N Karun
- Sooraj Santhosh (Singer)
- Sajeev Koshy OAM
- M. V. Nikesh Kumar
- Niranj Maniyanpilla Raju
- Dhanya Ananya (actress)
- Basant Balaji - Judge, Kerala High Court
- Swathy Nithyanand (Actress)

== Notable Staff ==
- T. K. Doraiswamy - Professor of English (poet/novelist/translator/short fiction writer)
