= Major archbishop =

High-ranking religious position in Eastern Catholic Church

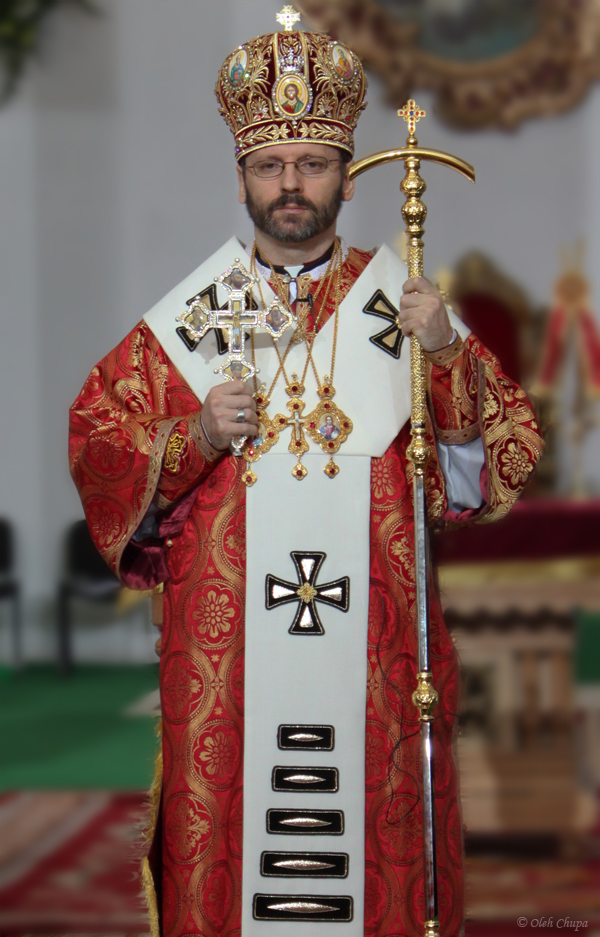
Major Archeparch Sviatoslav Shevchuk of Kyiv-Galicia, Ukrainian Greek Catholic Church

In the Eastern Catholic Churches, major archbishop (sometimes also styled as major archeparch) is a title for the chief hierarch ("Father and Head") of an autonomous (sui juris) particular church that has not been "endowed with the patriarchal title". Major archbishops generally have the same rights, privileges, and jurisdiction as Eastern Catholic patriarchs, except where expressly provided otherwise, and rank immediately after them in precedence of honor.

In addition to their role governing their particular church, major archbishops, like Eastern Catholic patriarchs, are ex officio members of the Congregation for the Oriental Churches in the Roman Curia. They are required to attend general meetings of this congregation, usually held annually, as well as other sessions if they are visiting Rome or are otherwise able to attend.

There are currently four major archbishops, each leading a major archiepiscopal autonomous church.

== History ==
The Second Vatican Council's Decree on the Catholic Churches of the Eastern Rite recognised the equal standing of major archbishops alongside the patriarchs, whose role had been long-established in the church.

The title "major archbishop" was first granted to the head of the Ukrainian Greek Catholic Church in 1963. There was a strong movement within and after the Second Vatican Council to elevate Josyf Slipyj, then metropolitan of Lviv, for the Ukrainians, to the status of patriarch. Many of his admirers use this title for Slipyj when referring to him historically and many in Ukraine use this title for the current major archbishop even today. However (and at the behest of Russian Orthodox officials), Pope Paul VI specifically declined to grant this title, instead creating this new title and appointing Slipyj the first "major archbishop" of Lviv (the seat has since been moved to Kyiv). Slipyj's successors have only used the title of major archbishop.

The Syro-Malabar Church became major archiepiscopal in 1992, followed by the Syro-Malankara Catholic Church and the Romanian Greek Catholic Church in 2005.

== Comparison to other titles ==
Compared to other titles available to the heads of sui juris Eastern Catholic Churches, the title of "major archbishop" falls below "patriarch" in honour and above "metropolitan archbishop". The title is used for archbishops of episcopal sees which were founded more recently than the patriarchal sees and are therefore less prestigious. Canon law, however generally treats major archbishops as equivalent to patriarchs, except where specifically provided otherwise. What differences there are between the two offices are mainly differences of ceremony or honor. Major archbishops rank immediately below patriarchs in the order of precedence of the Catholic Church. If made members of the College of Cardinals, major archbishops join the order of Cardinal-Priests, whereas Eastern Catholic patriarchs join the highest order as Cardinal-Bishops. Like patriarchs, major archbishops are elected by the synod of the sui iuris Church, but their election requires confirmation by the Pope, not the simple notification and request for communion required of patriarchs. On the other hand, metropolitan archbishops of Eastern Catholic Churches sui juris are appointed by the Pope (rather than elected by their synod) and have much less authority even within their own churches.

The title major archbishop in the Catholic Church is roughly equivalent and alternative to the other title of catholicos used historically for the primate of a synod in many of the churches outside the Roman Empire (whereas "patriarch" was a term used within the Empire). Catholicos is used internally by the Syro-Malankara Church for their major archbishop. It can also be used to describe the major archbishops of other Oriental Catholic Churches

== List of Major Archbishops ==
This section provides a complete list of every bishop who has held the title of major archbishop, organized according to the precedence of their titles, which follows the order in which their churches became major archiepiscopal. So far, every major archbishop has been a cardinal except for Cyril Baselios and Sviatoslav Shevchuk.

Antony Padiyara, Lubomyr Husar and George Alencherry are the only major archbishops to resign: all the others have died in office.

=== Ukrainian Greek Catholic Church ===
- Josyf Slipyj, Major Archbishop of Lviv, 23 December 1963 − 7 September 1984 (Note: Slipyj became Metropolitan Archbishop of Lviv on 1 November 1944, but he was not elevated to the title of Major Archbishop until 1963.)
- Myroslav Ivan Lubachivsky, Major Archbishop of Lviv, 7 September 1984 − 14 December 2000 (Note: Because he had been appointed coadjutor to Slipyj, Lubachivsky succeeded directly to the major archiepiscopacy upon Slipyj's death.)
- Lubomyr Husar, 26 January 2001 − 10 February 2011 (Note: The see of the Ukrainian Greek Catholic Church, and with it the title of the Major Archbishop, was transferred from Lviv to Kyiv in 2005. Hence Lubomyr Husar began his reign as Major Archbishop in Lviv and ended it in Kyiv.)
  - as Major Archbishop of Lviv, 26 January 2001 − 29 August 2005
  - as Major Archbishop of Kyiv-Galicia, 29 August 2005 − 10 February 2011
- Sviatoslav Shevchuk, Major Archbishop of Kyiv-Galicia, 25 March 2011 − present

For a complete list of heads of the Ukrainian Greek Catholic Church, including prior to its establishment as a major archiepiscopal church, see List of Leaders of the Ukrainian Greek Catholic Church.

=== Syro-Malabar Catholic Church ===
- Antony Padiyara, Major Archbishop of Ernakulam–Angamaly, 16 December 1992 − 11 November 1999 (Note: Padiyara became Metropolitan Archbishop of Ernakulam on 23 April 1985, but he was not elevated to the title of Major Archbishop until 1992. The promotion of the see to a major archeparchy was simultaneous with a change of its name to Ernakulam-Angamaly.)
- Varkey Vithayathil, Major Archbishop of Ernakulam–Angamaly, 23 December 1999 − 1 April 2011
- George Alencherry, Major Archbishop of Ernakulam–Angamaly, 25 May 2011 − 7 December 2023
- Raphael Thattil, Major Archbishop of Ernakulam–Angamaly, 9 January 2024 − present

For a complete list of heads of the Syro-Malabar Catholic Church, including prior to its establishment as a major archiepiscopal church, see List of Major Archbishops of the Syro-Malabar Church.

=== Syro-Malankara Catholic Church ===
- Cyril Baselios, Major Archbishop of Trivandrum, 10 February 2005 − 18 January 2007 (Note: Baselios became Metropolitan Archbishop of Trivandrum on 6 November 1995, but he was not elevated to the title of Major Archbishop until 2005.)
- Baselios Cleemis, Major Archbishop of Trivandrum, 10 February 2007 − present

For a complete list of heads of the Syro-Malankara Catholic Church, including prior to its establishment as a major archiepiscopal church, see List of Major Archbishops of Thiruvananthapuram.

=== Romanian Greek Catholic Church ===
- Lucian Mureșan, Major Archbishop of Făgăraș and Alba Iulia, 16 December 2005 − 25 September 2025 (Note: Mureșan became Metropolitan Archbishop of Făgăraș and Alba Iulia on 4 July 1994, but he was not elevated to the title of Major Archbishop until 2005.)
- Claudiu-Lucian Pop, Major Archbishop of Făgăraș and Alba Iulia, 5 November 2025 − present

For a complete list of heads of the Romanian Greek Catholic Church, including prior to its establishment as a major archiepiscopal church, see List of bishops of Făgăraș and Alba Iulia.
