= The Bethany Ashram =

Bethany Ashram
- ബഥനി ആശ്രമം
- Bethany Ashram Logo

Monastery information
- Order: Order of the Imitation of Christ
- Established: 15 August 1919

People
- Founder: Geevarghese Mar Ivanios
- Abbot: Very. Rev. Fr. Geevarghese Kuttiyil OIC
- Website: Bethany Ashram Official Page

Bethany Ashram, is a monastic order in the Syro-Malankara Catholic Church. It was established by Archbishop Geevarghese Mar Ivanios. The Ashram follows the religious order called Order of the Imitation of Christ (O.I.C.), which is derived from the Catholic devotional book called The Imitation of Christ by Thomas à Kempis.

== History of the Founder ==
Geevarghese Mar Ivanios, who founded Bethany Ashram, was born on 21 September 1882 at Mavelikara to the 'Mallitta' Panikar family, belonging to the Malankara Church. He was given the baptismal name Geevarghese. At the age of 15 he joined M.D.Seminary School for high school studies. On 20 April 1898 he received minor orders and was sent to Madras Christian College for higher studies, there he obtained his master's degree. On Sept.15th 1908 Geevarghese was ordained priest by Vattasseril Mar Dinoysius. Just after the ordination Fr.P.T.Geevarghese was appointed Principal of M.D.Seminary, Kottayam. He moved to Calcutta in the year 1913, accepting an invitation from Dr. George Howells, the principal of Serampore College to teach there. He made use of this opportunity to educate the Malankara Youth. About 20 young people from Kerala reached Calcutta for higher education.

== Foundation of the Ashram ==
At Serampore Fr.P.T.Geevarghese got more time for prayer and contemplation. He came across the writings of St. Basil on monasticism. Basilian monastic vision had a great influence on him. Besides the visits to the Sabarmati Ashram of Mahatma Gandhi and Santiniketan of Rabindranath Tagore gave him a new vision of Indian Sanyasa (monasticism). These experiences made him to reflect upon starting an order of missionaries to carry out the task of evangelization in India. Slowly the residence of Fr.P.T.Geevarghese and his followers at Serampore became an Ashram (Monastery), and they began to live a sort of religious life according to the monastic rules of St. Basil, adapting them to Indian culture. As he accepted this as his way of life, he resigned from the Serampore College.

On his return from Calcutta, Fr. P.T.Geevarghese looked for a location to establish an ashram. One of his friend Advocate E. J. John donated 100 acres (400,000 m^{2}) of land at Mundanmala, Ranni-Perunadu, Kerala at the meeting place of the rivers Pampa and Kakkatt. The adjacent area of 300 acres (1,200,000 m^{2}) was bought from the Government of Travancore at a rate of 5 rupee per acre using the fund of about 2000 rupee from his father. The place was thickly filled with thorny bushes and herbs. Fr. P.T.Geevarghese and his followers built a small thatched hut made out of the branches of trees and bamboo. This turned to be the first Ashram in Malankara on 15 August 1919. He prayerfully searched for a name for the Ashram and opened the Bible and he got the word "Bethany". He meditated upon it and came to the conclusion that it is an apt name for a religious order which upholds both contemplation and action. Eventually the Bethany Ashram became a place of pilgrimage and spiritual experience. Spiritual retreats and discourses were given by Fr. P.T.Geevarghese especially in the Passion Week. Fr. P.T.Geevarghese envisioned the Ashram also being a shelter for the poor and the marginalised. Along with the Ashram he started a house for the orphans.

Fr. P.T.Geevarghese founded the Bethany Madhom for religious women in 1925, with the help of the Anglican sisters, entitled Oxford Mission Sisterhood of the Epiphany working at Serampore.

== Bishop of Bethany ==
The Malankara Synod decided to ordain Fr. P.T.Geevarghese as the bishop of bethany. He was ordained by Catholicos Baselios Geevarghese I on 1 May 1925. He received the name Geevarghese Mar Ivanios. After the consecration there was a meeting to felicitate Mar Ivanios. In this meeting Mar Ivanios expressed his desire that the church might become one flock under one shepherd.

== Reunion Movement ==
On 20 September 1930 Mar Ivanios along with Mar Theophilos, the suffragan bishop of Bethany, Fr. John Kuzhinapurath OIC, Deacon Alexander Attupurath OIC, Chacko Kiliyileth and most of the members of both the Bethany orders reunited with the Catholic Church establishing the Eastern Catholic sui iuris Syro-Malankara Catholic Church in India. The Reunion Movement gained rapid momentum under the leadership of Geevarghese Mar Ivanios.

== 100 Years of Bethany ==
Inauguration of the centenary celebration was carried out at Muvattupuzha on 21 September 2018 and the closing of the centenary celebration happened at Pattom, trivandrum on 21 September 2019.
