= Major Archeparchy of Trivandrum =

Eastern Catholic archeparchy in Kerala, India

Coordinates: 8.4333°N 76.9167°E

Major Archeparchy of Trivandrum Trivandrensis Syrorum Malankarensium

Location
- Country: India
- Metropolitan: Thiruvananthapuram, Kerala, India

Statistics
- Parishes: 217

Information
- Denomination: Catholic Church
- Sui iuris church: Syro-Malankara Catholic Church
- Rite: Syro-Malankara Rite
- Established: 1932
- Cathedral: Cathedral of Saint Mary, Pattom
- Patron saint: Saint Peter

Current leadership
- Pope: Leo XIV
- Major Archbishop: Baselios Cardinal Cleemis Catholicos
- Auxiliary Bishops: Yoohanon Alexios Kuttiyil

Website
- catholicate.net

The Major Archeparchy of Trivandrum is a Syro-Malankara Catholic Church ecclesiastical territory or major archeparchy of the Catholic Church in Thiruvananthapuram, India. Baselios Cleemis, the Major Archbishop-Catholicos of the Syro-Malankara Catholic Church, presides over the as of 2020. The cathedra is at Cathedral of Saint Mary, Pattom, Trivandrum in Pattom, Thiruvananthapuram, Kerala. The Archeparchy of Trivandrum is a metropolitan see with five suffragan eparchies.

== History ==
The Archeparchy of Trivandrum was erected in 1932. Its suffragan eparchies are Marthandom, Mavelikara, Pathanamthitta, Parassala and St. Ephrem of Khadki.

== Major Archbishop-Catholicos ==
Baselios Cardinal Cleemis, Major Archbishop of Trivandrum and Catholicos of the Syro-Malankara Catholic Church, was elected Major Archbishop of Trivandrum in 2007.

== Statistics ==
In 2020 the Archeparchy had an estimated 1,81,400 faithful, in 217 parishes, with 151 diocesan priests, 34 religious priests, 19 religious brothers, 642 religious sisters, and 89 seminarians.

== Saints and causes for canonisation ==
- Geevarghese Ivanios

== Seminaries ==
- St. Mary’s Malankara Major Seminary
- St. Aloysius Seminary, Thiruvananthapuram
