= List of Syro-Malankara Catholic eparchies and bishops =

The Syro-Malankara Church, an Eastern Catholic church sui iuris particular church that employs the West Syriac Rite, part of the larger Catholic Church, traces its origin to apostolic times and a reunification with the See of Peter in the 20th century. It is one of the major archiepiscopal churches of the Catholic Church headed by Major Archbishop Catholicos of the Major Archdiocese of Trivandrum based in Kerala, India.

The Malankara Syrian Catholic Church traces its origins to the missions of Thomas the Apostle in the 1st century. The Church employs the West Syriac Rite Divine Liturgy of Saint James.

== Cardinals from the Syro Malankara Church ==
Elector

Rank	Coat of arms/seal	Cardinal	Titular Church	Other Posts
Cardinal-Priest		Baselios Cardinal Cleemis	Title of San Gregorio VII	Major Archbishop-Catholicos; member of the Dicastery for the Eastern Churches and Dicastery for Interreligious Dialogue, age 67.

== Major Archepiscopial Curia ==
Major Archbishop-Catholicos
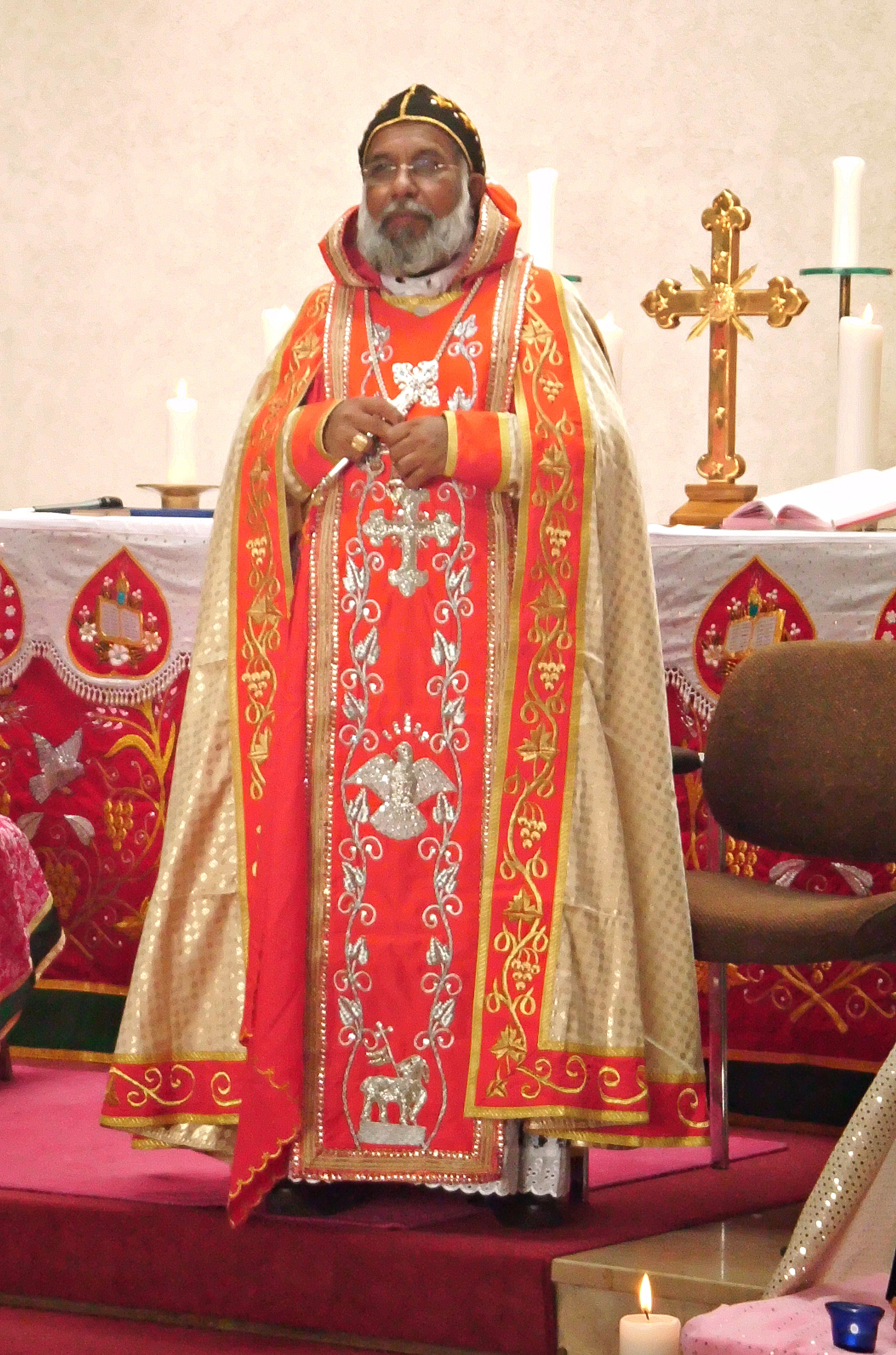

His Eminent Beatitude
Moran Mor
Baselios Cardinal Cleemis

Title
- Catholicos
- Head of Syro Malankara Church
- President of the Holy Synod of Syro Malankara Church
- Archeparch of Trivandrum
- Metropolitan of the Province of Trivandrum
Seat
Major Metropolitanate of Trivandrum &

Major-Archiepiscopal Curia, Pattom

== Bishop of the Major Archepiscopial Curia ==
Post / Seat	Bishop's coat of arms/seal	Eparch	Title
Curia Bishop
Major Archiepiscopal Curia, Pattom		Antony Mar Silvanos	Curia Bishop

== Eparchies under Syro-Malankara provinces and their Hierarchs ==
Emeritus or Retired hierarchs

Eparchy	Eparchy coat of arms/seal	Eparch	Title
Ecclesiastical Province of Trivandrum
Major Metropolitanate of Trivandrum (Thiruvananthapuram)		Baselios Mor Cleemis	Metropolitan Major Archeparch of Trivandrum
Major Metropolitanate of Trivandrum (Thiruvananthapuram)		Yoohanon Mar Alexios	Auxiliary Eparch of Trivandrum
Eparchy of St. Ephrem of Khadki		Mathews Mar Pachomios	Eparch of St. Ephrem of Khadki
Eparchy of Marthandom		Vincent Mar Paulos	Eparch of Marthandom
Eparchy of Mavelikara		Mathew Mar Polycarpos	Eparch of Mavelikara
Eparchy of Mavelikara		Joshua Mar Ignathios	Eparch emeritus of Mavelikara
Eparchy of Parassala		Thomas Mar Eusebius	Eparch of Parassala
Eparchy of Pathanamthitta		Samuel Mar Irenios	Eparch of Pathanamthitta
Eparchy of Pathanamthitta		Yoohanon Mar Chrysostom	Eparch emeritus of Pathanamthitta
Ecclesiastical Province of Thiruvalla
Metropolitanate of Tiruvalla		Thomas Mar Koorilos	Metropolitan Archeparch of Tiruvalla, Secretary of the Holy Episcopal Synod
Eparchy of Bathery		Joseph Mar Thomas	Eparch of Bathery
Eparchy of Muvattupuzha		Yoohanon Mar Theodosius	Eparch of Muvattupuzha
Eparchy of Puthur		Geevarghese Mar Makarios	Eparch of Puthur

== Eparchies immediately subject to the Holy See ==
Eparchy	Eparchy coat of arms/seal	Territory	Eparch	Title
India
Eparchy of St. John Chrysostom of Gurgaon		Territories in India outside proper ecclesiastical provinces	Thomas Mar Anthonios OIC	Eparch of St. John Chrysostom of Gurgaon
North America
Eparchy of St. Mary, Queen of Peace of USA and Canada		United States of America, and Canada	Philippos Mar Stephanos	Eparch of St. Mary, Queen of Peace of USA and Canada

== Apostolic Visitations ==
Apostolic Visitations under direct jurisdiction of the Major Archbishop
Visitation	Visitation coat of arms/seal	Territory	Apostolic Visitator	Title
Europe		(Austria) (Germany) (United Kingdom) (Republic of Ireland) (Italy) (Switzerland)	Kuriakose Mar Osthathios	Apostolic Visitator for the Syro Malankara faithful in Europe
Oceania		(Singapore) (New Zealand) (Australia)	Antony Mar Silvanos	Apostolic Visitator for the Syro-Malankara faithful in Oceania

== Titular see ==
The Syro-Malankara Catholic Church has a singular titular episcopal see, which was established in 1977, formerly held by auxiliary bishops of the Church.

Since 29 August 2020, it has been held by the auxiliary eparch of the Syro-Malabar Catholic Archeparchy of Kottayam for the Knanaya, responsible for the Forane, which consists of members following the Malankara Rite liturgy within the archeparchy.

Post / Seat	Bishop's coat of arms/seal	Eparch	Title
Titular Episcopal See
Chayal (Latin: Chaialum)		Gheevarghese Mar Aprem ^{α}	Titular Archbishop of Chayal and Auxiliary Eparch of the Archeparchy of Kottayam

== Hierarchs working for the Holy See ==
Post / Seat	Bishop's coat of arms/seal	Eparch	Title
Propaganda Fide - Diplomatic Posts
Apostolic Nunciature to Kazakhstan, Apostolic Nunciature to Kyrgyzstan, Apostolic Nunciature to Tajikistan		Mar George Panamthundil	Titular Archbishop of Floriana and Apostolic Nuncio to Kazakhstan, Apostolic Nuncio to Kyrgyzstan, Apostolic Nuncio to Tajikistan

== Notes ==
^α Not a member of the hierarchy of the Syro-Malankara Church, rather a member of the Syro-Malabar Church.
