= St. Jude Syro-Malankara Catholic Church =

St. Jude Syro Malankara Catholic Church
- Location within Pennsylvania
- 40°3′12.587″N 75°7′25.5385″W
- Location: 1200 Park Avenue. Bensalem, Pennsylvania
- Country: United States
- Denomination: Syro Malankara Catholic Church
- Website: www.syromalankarausa.org/content/st-jude-syro-malankara-catholic-parish

History
- Founded: March 1985 (Mission) August 16, 2009 (Parish)

Architecture
- Groundbreaking: 1975
- Completed: 1976

Administration
- Diocese: Syro-Malankara Catholic Eparchy of the United States of America and Canada

Clergy
- Bishop: Most Rev. Philippos Stephanos Thottathil
- Priest: Rev Fr. Babu Madathiparambil

St. Jude Syro Malankara Catholic Church is a parish of the Syro-Malankara Catholic Eparchy of the United States of America and Canada located in Bensalem, Pennsylvania, US. St Jude celebrates Qurbono in Malayalam and English and serves members of the Syro-Malankara Catholic Church in the Delaware Valley.

== History ==
The Immigration and Nationality Act of 1965 paved the way for many Indians to immigrate into the U.S. During the early 1970s, many Malankara Catholics began to migrate to the U.S. and settle in different parts of the country. Many of them chose Philadelphia as their new home town, but Malankara Liturgical Services were not available then.

A Malankara community became possible when Benedict Mar Gregorios OIC, the Archbishop of Trivandrum and the head of the Malankara Catholic Hierarchy, visited the U.S. and Canada in August 1982 and established prayer groups in major North American cities. Regular prayer meetings were held at the residences of members and Holy Masses were celebrated when Malankara priests were available. The presence of Ignatius Thangalathil OIC, a Malankara missionary priest on special assignment in New York, helped in the formation of a Malankara Community in early 1983. The subsequent visits of the Archbishop in 1993 and 1994 helped the community. Then the Malankara Catholic Mission of North America was inaugurated in New York in 1984.

In March 1985, Archbishop Mar Gregorios, in consultation with John Cardinal Krol, Archbishop of Philadelphia, appointed John Kalloor (now Yoohanon Mar Chrysostom) as pastor of the Malankarites in Philadelphia and Washington. The Malankara Catholic Community in Philadelphia then had regularly scheduled Malankara Liturgy celebrated at Incarnation of Our Lord Church. While organizing the community, Fr. Kalloor initiated the Malankara Catholic Youth Movement (MCYM), which became the cornerstone of building the parish.

Varghese Edathil, the successor of Fr. Kalloor, took charge of the community on March 30, 1987. He served as an associate pastor of Incarnation Church and spiritual director of the Malankara faithful. A Malankara Children’s League was inaugurated for youngsters, and religious instruction classes were initiated.

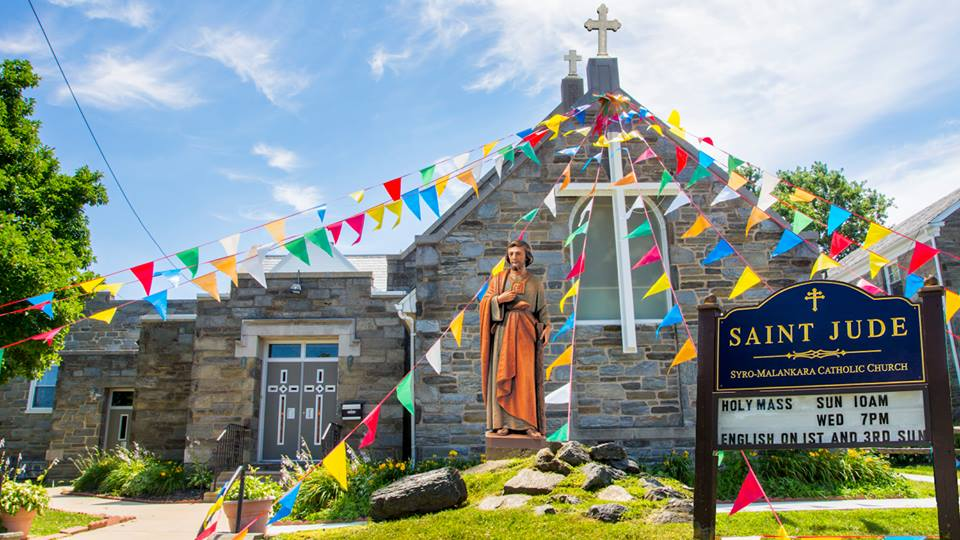

At the urging of Mar Gregorios, Cardinal Anthony Bevilacqua, Archbishop of Philadelphia, officially established the Malankara Catholic Mission of Philadelphia on May 2, 1988.

Fr. Alexander Panamkunil was the successor of Fr. Varghese and took charge as the Associate pastor of Incarnation Church and spiritual director of Malankara Catholics in October 1991. Geevarghese Mar Timotheos, Bishop of Thiruvalla and Cyril Mar Baselious visited the community.

In April 1995, Rev. John Kalloor succeeded Fr. Alexander as the parochial vicar of Incarnation Church and spiritual director of the Malankara Catholic Mission. Two family conferences of the Malankaraites of the Eastern regions, (New York, New Jersey, Washington and Philadelphia) were conducted at Philadelphia (1993, 1995) to discuss and evaluate issues pertaining to Malankaraite life in the U.S. The second Family conference was directed by Mar Thimotheos.

== 21st century ==
The name "St. Jude" was chosen by the Archbishop of Tiruvilla Thomas Mar Koorilos. On October 31, 2008, St Jude purchased a church building in Philadelphia.

The current parish site was purchased from the Archdiocese of Philadelphia on January 16, 2020. In the early days of the COVID-19 pandemic, live streams of the Holy Qurbono and other liturgical services were provided to comply with restrictions on gatherings in place at that time.

St. Jude Syro Malankara Catholic Church consists of 130 families with over 400 members. Holy Qurbono, prayer meetings, and Malankara Qurbono are held in English on 1st and 3rd Sundays and in Malayalam on 2nd, 4th and 5th Sundays. Major church feasts are primarily in Malayalam with elements of English. Sunday School classes are held before Sunday Mass.

There are numerous ministries supporting the efforts of the church. Malankara Catholic Children’s League (MCCL) is for Sunday School students. A unit of the Malankara Catholic Youth Movement (MCYM) serves Malankara Catholics aged 13-30. Mothers Forum is a group for Mothers. Malankara Catholic Association (MCA) is for parish members 35 and older. Recently, a Family Ministry initiative has been launched in part to help support parents and families who grew up outside of Kerala.

Altar servers are trained to carry on the Malankara Liturgy under the direction of the liturgical coordinator. Choir ministries also exist to help lead Malankara liturgical songs.

== Vicars ==
List of Vicars
No.	Title	Name	Tenure
1	Priest	Rev. Fr. John Kalloor	1983–1987
2	Priest	Rev. Fr. Varughese George Edathil	1987–1991
3	Priest	Rev. Fr. Alexander Panamkunil	1991–1994
4	Chorbishop	Rev. Fr. John Kalloor	1994–1998
5	Priest	Rev. Fr. Chacko Thadathil	1998–2002
6	Priest	Rev. Fr. Geevarghese Vaidyan	2002–2006
7	Priest	Rev. Fr. Joseph Sundaram	2006 – June 2010
8	Priest	Rev. Fr. John Thundiyath	June 2010 – Sep 2010
9	Priest	Rev. Fr. Thomas Malayil	Sep 2010 – Aug 2014
10	Priest	Rev. Fr. Saji Mukkoot	Aug 2014 – October 2021
11	Priest	Rev. Fr. Babu Madathilparambil	October 2021 - Present
