= Sacred Heart Malankara Catholic Church, Mylapra =

Syro-Malankara Catholic parish church in India

Coordinates: 9°15′49″N 76°47′55″E

Sacred Heart Malankara Syrian Catholic Church, Mylapra
- തിരുഹൃദയ മലങ്കര സുറിയാനി കത്തോലിക്കാ പള്ളി, മൈലപ്ര
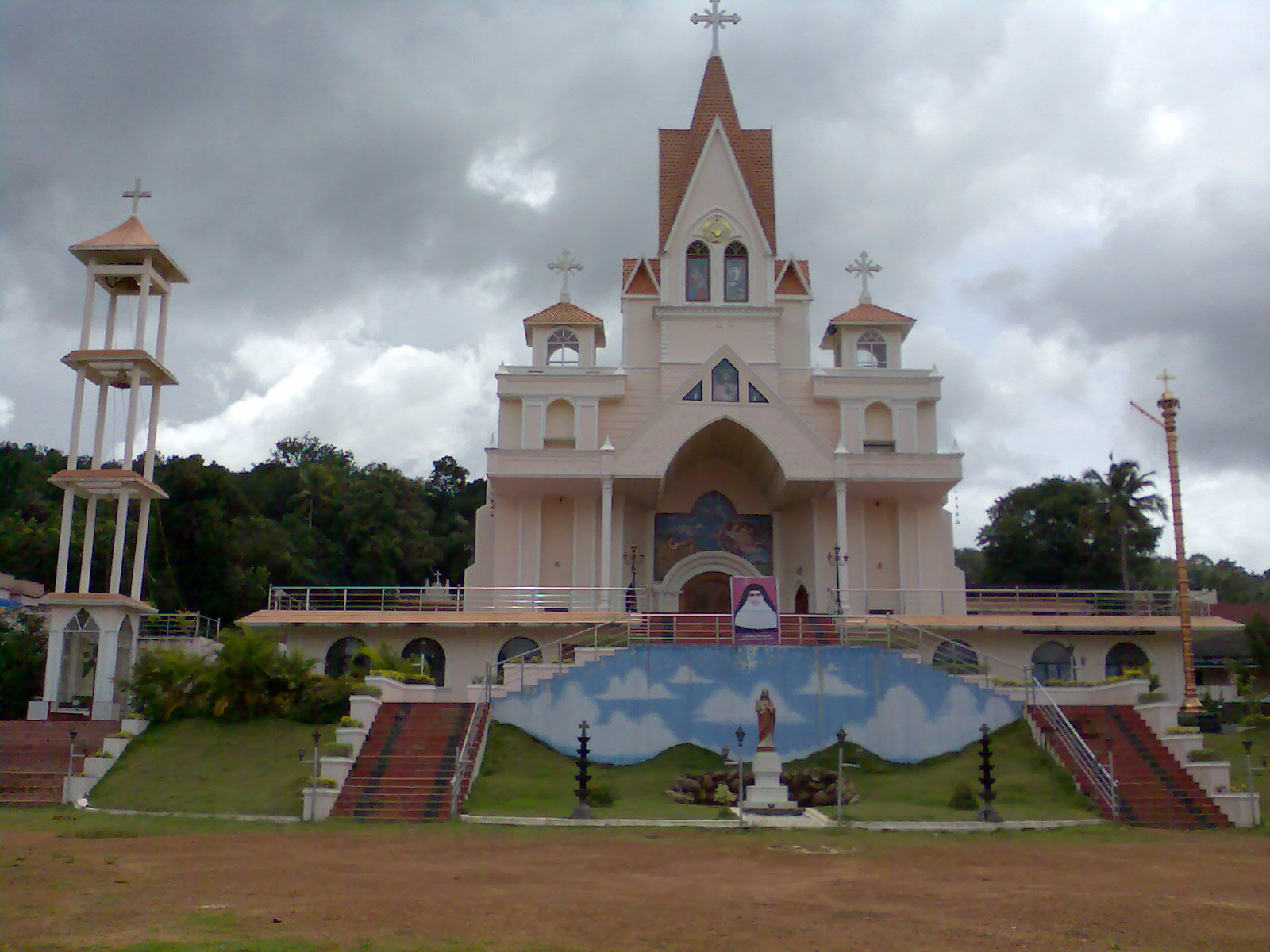
- Sacred Heart Malankara Syrian Catholic Church, Mylapra
- Location: Puthiyamelethil Rd, Mylapra, Pathanamthitta, Kerala
- Country: India
- Denomination: Catholic Church (Syro-Malankara Catholic Church)
- Website: shchurchmylapra.com

History
- Status: Parish Church
- Founded: 1932
- Founder: Rev. Fr. A G Abraham Thengumtharamedayil
- Dedication: Most Sacred Heart of Jesus
- Dedicated: 11 March 1933

Architecture
- Functional status: Active
- Style: Indian-NeoGothic
- Years built: 9 June 1932

Administration
- Division: Ranni-Perunadu
- Diocese: Pathanamthitta
- Parish: Mylapra

Clergy
- Bishop: His Excellency Most Rev. Dr. Samuel Mar Irenios
- Vicar: Rev. Fr. Jose Kalavila

Sacred Heart Malankara Syrian Catholic Church or referred as S H Church is located in the village of Mylapra, near Pathanamthitta, on the road side of the Main Eastern Highway in the Indian state of Kerala. It is home to one of the first Syro-Malankara Catholic Church communities and is the biggest and oldest established church in the Eparchy of Pathanamthitta. This church is the patron of two schools, Mount Bethany EHSS and S H Higher Secondary School.

== History ==
Soon after the reunion movement in 1930 by Archbishop Geevarghese Mar Ivanios, about five families from Mylapra reached Thirumoolapuram and behold the Catholic Faith in the presence of Jacob Mar Theophilos. They established a small chapel named St. George Malankara Catholic Church in Mylapra on 9 June 1932 with 29 families and 106 members. Rev. Fr. M.T Philipos (Kumbazha Achan) served as the first Vicar of the parish. The history of the Catholic Church in Mylapra took a diversion on 19 January 1936 when Rev. Fr. A.G. Abraham Thengumtharamedayil (Mylapra Achan) with a group of more than 100 families embraced the Syro-Malankara Catholic Church before Archbishop Geevarghese Mar Ivanios at a ceremony held in the Mylapra school. When the community grew up, it was essential to build a large church to accommodate the faithful and so the church construction was started on 13 March 1941, with the foundation stone being laid by Archbishop Geevarghese Mar Ivanios. It was the diligent works of Rev. Fr. A.G. Abraham Thengumtharamedayil and K I Thomas Kalayil which made the ambiguous task possible. The church construction was completed on 15 September 1944 and the church was renamed as Sacred Heart Malankara Catholic Church, due to a request made by the German family who were the main sponsors. Rev. Fr. A.G. Abraham Thengumtharamedayil was the first vicar of this church. After 58 yrs, the parish vicar and the committee members decided to reconstruct the church in 2002, due to the lack of space. The foundation stone was laid by Moran Mor Cyril Baselios Catholicos on 12 January 2003 and was reconstructed under the leadership of Rev. Fr. John G Vadakepuram and M T Thomas Mannil. The church was consecrated by Moran Mor Baselios Cleemis Catholicos along with Joshua Mar Ignathios and Yoohanon Mar Chrysostom in a ceremony held on 28 and 29 December 2007.

== Educational institutions ==
- Mount Bethany English Higher Secondary School, Mylapra
- Sacred Heart Higher Secondary School, Mylapra
- Sacred Heart Teachers Training College, Mylapra

== Gallery ==
Rev. Fr. A G Abraham Thengumtharamedayil (Mylapra Achan)

Rev. Fr. Jose Chamakalayil with other curia members

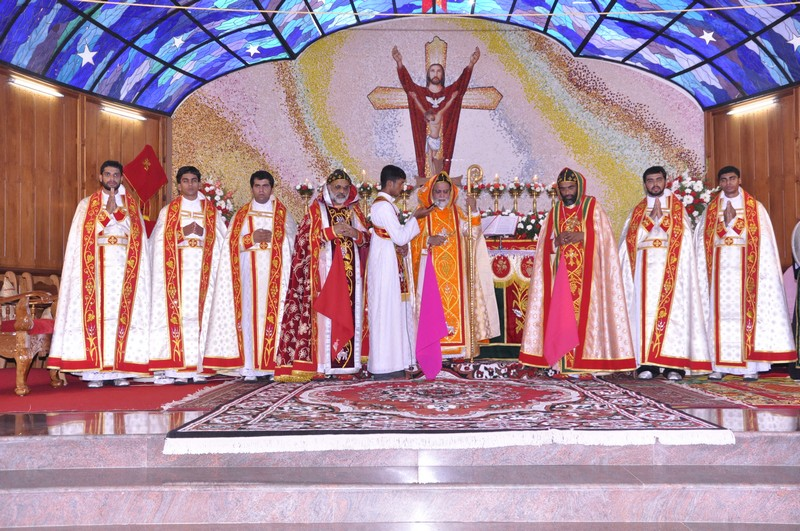
Ordination of priests held at the Church
