= Syro-Malankara Catholic Eparchy of Pathanamthitta =

Eastern Catholic eparchy in Kerala, India

Eparchy of Pathanamthitta Eparchiae Pathanamthitta

Location
- Country: India
- Ecclesiastical province: Trivandrum
- Coordinates: 9°16′53″N 76°47′14″E

Statistics
- Area: 2,100 km^{2} (810 sq mi)
- Population: Total; Catholics: (as of 2010); 1,234,016; 40,563
- Parishes: 100
- Members: 37,500

Information
- Denomination: Catholic Church
- Sui iuris church: Syro-Malankara Catholic Church
- Rite: Malankara Rite
- Cathedral: St. Peter’s Malankara Catholic Church, Pathanamthitta
- Patron saint: St Peter
- Secular priests: 89

Current leadership
- Pope: Leo XIV
- Major Archbishop: Moran Mor Baselios Cleemis Catholicos
- Eparch: Samuel Mar Irenios
- Vicar General: Msgr. Varghese Mathew Kalayil Vadakkethil
- Bishops emeritus: Yoohanon Chrysostom

Map
- Location of Pathanamthitta in Kerala

Website
- pathanamthittadiocese.com

The Eparchy of Pathanamthitta is a Syro-Malankara Catholic Church ecclesiastical territory or eparchy of the Catholic Church in Kerala, India. The diocese was created by Pope Benedict XVI on 25 January 2010. Yoohanon Chrysostom became the first eparch. St. Peter’s Malankara Catholic Church in the episcopal see of Pathanamthitta serves as the cathedral church. The Eparchy of Pathanamthitta is a suffragan eparchy in the ecclesiastical province of the metropolitan Archeparchy of Trivandrum.

== History ==
The Syro-Malankara Catholics are one of the oldest Saint Thomas Christians centered in Kerala, India. In the 16th century, the Catholics of the Latin Church came in contact with the Indian Christians through the Portuguese merchants and missionaries. But the relationship was fragile and several conflicts evolved among them, which later resulted in the Coonan Cross Oath. The majority of them restored ecclesial relationship with the Portuguese padroado hierarchy through the Syro-Malabar Catholic Church, while others formed themselves into an independent ecclesial community as the Malankara Church and gradually established a relationship with the Church of the Antioch. Later, on 20 September 1930, a group headed by Geevarghese Ivanios lead the reunion movement and returned to the Catholic Church. The Metropolitan Eparchy of Trivandrum was inaugurated on 11 May 1933 and Geevarghese Ivanios was installed as its first Metropolitan. To cope up with the tremendous growth of the church the Major Archeparchy of Trivandrum was ramified and a new Eparchy of Pathanamthitta was formed.

== Statistics ==
As of 2021, there are 100 parishes in the Diocese and the number of priests incardinated is 120. The diocese has about 80 seminarians pursuing different grades in their priestly formation.The diocese possesses 10,000 families of Catholic faithful in its territory. A bigger part of the malankara global diaspora comes from this diocese. The diocesan area is basically hilly in nature including a considerable number of tribal colonies. The Exarcate of the United States got its first bishop Thomas Eusebius from the Sacred Heart Malankara Catholic Church in Mylapra the Eparch of Pathanamthitta.

== Curia members ==
Designation	Name
Syncellus (Vicar General)	Msgr. Varghese Mathew Kalayil Vadakkethil
Chancellor	Rt. Rev. Sebastian Ambasseril Corepiscopa
Economus (Procurator)	Fr. Abraham (Jinse) Meppurathu
Judicial Vicar	Fr. Kuriakose Kuthinethu
Rector of Minor Seminary	Fr. Sijo James Charivuparambil

== The Heads of Various Apostolic Services ==
Designation	Name
Rector, Minor Seminary	Fr. Sijo James Charivuparambil
Director, Evangelization	Fr. Mathew Neriattil
Director, Catechism	Fr. Robin Manackalethu
Spiritual Advisor, Malankara Catholic Association (MCA)	Fr. Abraham Mannil
Director, Malankara Catholic Youth Movement (MCYM)	Fr. Skariah (Job) Pathalil
Director, Malankara Catholic Mothers' Forum (MCMF)	Fr. Varghese Chamakalayil
Director, Family Apostolate	Fr. Varghese Thomas Chamakalayil
Director, Bible Apostolate	Fr. Chacko Karippon
Correspondent, Aided Schools	Msgr. Varghese Kalayil Vadakkethil
Correspondent, Unaided Schools	Msgr. Varghese Kalayil Vadakkethil
Director, Legion of Mary	Fr. Anto Kannamkulam
Director, Social Service	Fr. Varghese Chamakalayil
Spiritual Advisor, Vincent De Paul Society	Fr. George Varghese Puthuparambil
Public Relations' Officer	Fr. Joel John Poweth
Director, Upasana Pastoral Centre	Fr. Thomas Cheruthode
Vocation Promoter	Fr. Sijo James Charivuparambil
Director, Dialogue Commission	Fr. Daniel Bethel
Director, Suvisheshsa Sangam	Fr. Thomas Nedumankuzhiyil
Director, Jagratha Commission	Fr. Scott Sleeba Pulimooden

== Parishes ==
Catholic Bishop's House, Pathanamthitta	Pathanamthitta
St. Peter's Cathedral	Pathanamthitta
Sacred Heart Malankara Catholic Church	Mylapra
St. Edward Malankara Syrian Catholic Church	Aranmula
St John's Malankara Syrian Catholic Church Kadammanitta	Kadammanitta
St. George Malankara Catholic Church, Ponnambu	Ponnambu
St. George Malankara Catholic Church, Elappupara	Elappupara
Sacred Heart Malankara Syrian Catholic Church	Vadakkupuram
St. Mary's Malankara Catholic Church	Kumbazha
St.Mary's Kurishumala Church	Perunad
St Peters Malankara Catholic Church	Attachakal
St.Mary's Malankara Catholic Church	Konny
St Mary's Malankara Catholic Church	Pambumala
St. John Chrysostom Malankara Catholic Church	Mannarakulanji
St. Mary's Malankara Catholic Church, Kumplampoika	Kumplampoika
St. Antony's Malankara Catholic Church	Vadasserikkara
St.Mary's Malankara Catholic Church	Vayalathala
St. George Malankara Catholic Church	Athirumkal
St. Teresa's Catholic Church	Murinjakal
St. Mary's Malankara Catholic Church	Nedumonkavu
St. Georges Malankara Catholic Church	Vallicode Kottayam
St.Mary's Malankara Catholic Church	Angadical
Syrian Malankara Catholic Church Mezhuveli	Mezhuveli West
St. Mary's Malankara Catholic Church	Kurichimuttam
St. Mary's Catholic Church	Chandanappally
St.Thomas Syro Malankara Catholic Church	Amalagiri-Kodumudi
St.Mary's Malankara Catholic Church	Seethathode
Malankara Syrian Catholic Church	Vayyattupuzha
St George Malankara Syrian Catholic Church	Thannithode
St. Mary's Malankara Catholic Church	Thekkuthode
St.George Malankara Catholic Church	Manneera
St. Benedict's Malankara Catholic Church	Kokkathode
St. Thomas Malankara Catholic Church, Valyayanthy	Valyayanthy
Malankara Catholic Church	Mekozhoor
St. Joseph Malankara Catholic Church	Karakkad
St.Thomas Malankara Catholic Church	Puthenpeedika
St Thomas Malankara Catholic Church, Mapilaly	Thumpamon
St. George Malankara Catholic Church, Erathumpamon	Erathumpamon
St. Benedict's Malanakara Catholic Church, Konnithazham	Konnithazham
Malankara Catholic Church, Carmala	Carmala
MCC, Puthukkulam	Puthukkulam
St. Mary's Malankara Catholic Church, Athumpumkulam	Athumpumkulam
St. Sebastian's Malankara Catholic Church, Avolikuzhy	Avolikuzhy
St. Mary's Malankara Catholic Church, Chittar	Chittar
MCC, Pampini	Pampini
St. Mary's Malankara Catholic Church	Moolakkayam
St. Theresa's Malankara Catholic Church, Pampavalli	Pampavalli
St. Mary's Malankara Catholic Church	Anandappally
St. Thomas Malankara Catholic Church	Angamoozhi
Malankara Catholic Church, Anjilikunnu	Anjilikunnu
St Patrick's Malakara Catholic Church	Chengara
St. George Malankara Catholic Church, Paranthal	Paranthal
St. George Malankara Catholic Church, Kallely	Kallely
St. Mary's Malankara Catholic Church, Oottupara	Oottupara
St. Mary's Malankara Catholic Church, Thonikadavu	Thonikadavu

== Gallery ==
Inauguration of the Eparchy

Inauguration of the 'UPASANA' Pastoral Centre, Omalloor

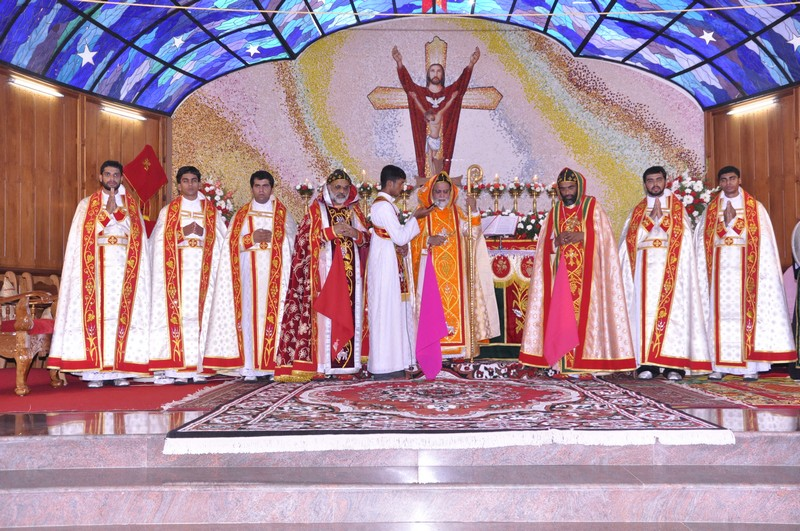
Ordination of priests held at S H Church, Mylapra

Yoohanon Chrysostom with Curia Members
