= Floriana, Mauritania =

Ancient city & Catholic titular see in Algeria

Coordinates: 35°56′14″N 2°25′14″E

Roman Empire - Mauretania Caesariensis (125 AD)

Floriana, Mauritania was an ancient Roman–Berber civitas in the province of Mauretania Caesariensis in Africa Proconsulare. It existed during the Vandal Kingdom, Byzantine Empire, and Roman Empire. The town of Floriana has been tentatively identified with ruins at Letourneux, Derrag in northern Algeria.

== Bishopric ==
The Roman town of Floriana, was the seat of an ancient Roman Catholic diocese. The only known bishop from antiquity is Restituto, who took part in the synod assembled in Carthage in 484 by the Vandal King Huneric, after which Restituto was exiled. The town and Bishopric did not effectively survive the Muslim conquest of the Maghreb but today Floriana survives as a titular bishopric and the current archbishop is George Panamthundil, apostolic nuncio to Kyrgyzstan and Tajikistan.

== See also ==
- Derrag
