= Cathedral of St Vincent de Paul (Malankara Catholic) =

Cathedral of St Vincent de Paul Malankara Syrian Catholic Church
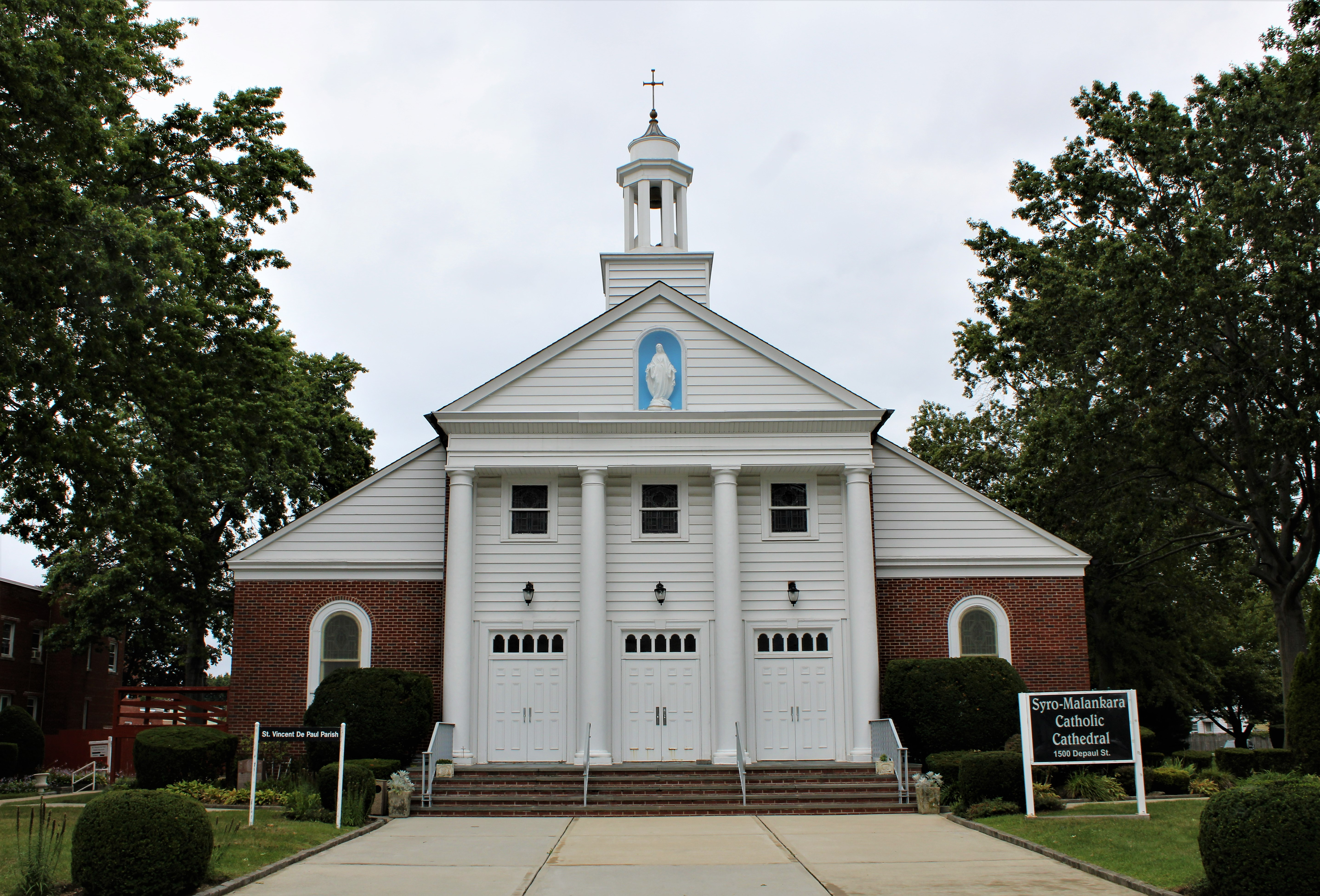
- Cathedral of St Vincent de Paul Malankara Syrian Catholic Church
- 40°42′35.86″N 73°41′47.62″W
- Location: 1500 De Paul St. Elmont, New York
- Country: United States
- Denomination: Syro-Malankara Catholic
- Previous denomination: Roman Catholic
- Website: www.malankaracatholicna.org

History
- Founded: September 8, 2013

Architecture
- Groundbreaking: 1952
- Completed: 1953

Administration
- Diocese: Syro-Malankara Catholic Eparchy of St. Mary, Queen of Peace, of the United States of America and Canada

Clergy
- Bishop: Philippos Stephanos Thottathil
- Rector: Thomas Ayyaneth

The Cathedral of St Vincent de Paul is the seat of the Syro-Malankara Catholic Eparchy of USA and Canada. It is located in Elmont, New York, United States.

== History ==
Syro-Malankara Catholics were among the Malayalis people who immigrated to North America from India in the 1960s and 1970s. Many of these people settled in New York City. They organized prayer meetings and celebrated the Syro-Malankara Catholic liturgy when Malankarite priests visited the United States. Chorbishop John Melamparampil was appointed as the first Coordinator for the Malankarites in the United States. He obtained a place for worship in the basement of Guardian Angel School at 21st Street and 10th Avenue in Manhattan. St John Chrysostom Malankara Catholic Church was established as a mission on Long Island on November 7, 1993. Three different Roman Catholic churches were used as places of worship. On November 13, 2011 St John Chrysostom was established as a parish at St Vincent de Paul Roman Catholic Church in Elmont.

St Vincent de Paul Cathedral Parish was established by Baselios Cleemis, Major Archbishop of the Syro-Malankara Catholic Church, and Thomas Mar Eusebius of the Syro-Malankara Catholic Exarchate on September 8, 2013. To create the new parish, the parishes of St John Chrysostom on Long Island and the parish of St Basil in Queens were merged. On January 4, 2016, the exarchate was promoted to eparchial status and renamed the Syro-Malankara Catholic Eparchy of St. Mary, Queen of Peace, of the United States of America and Canada.

On August 5, 2017, Philipos Stephanos was appointed as the second Bishop of the Eparchy of St. Mary, Queen of Peace of the Syro-Malankara Faithful in USA and Canada and was installed on October 28, 2017.

== Gallery ==
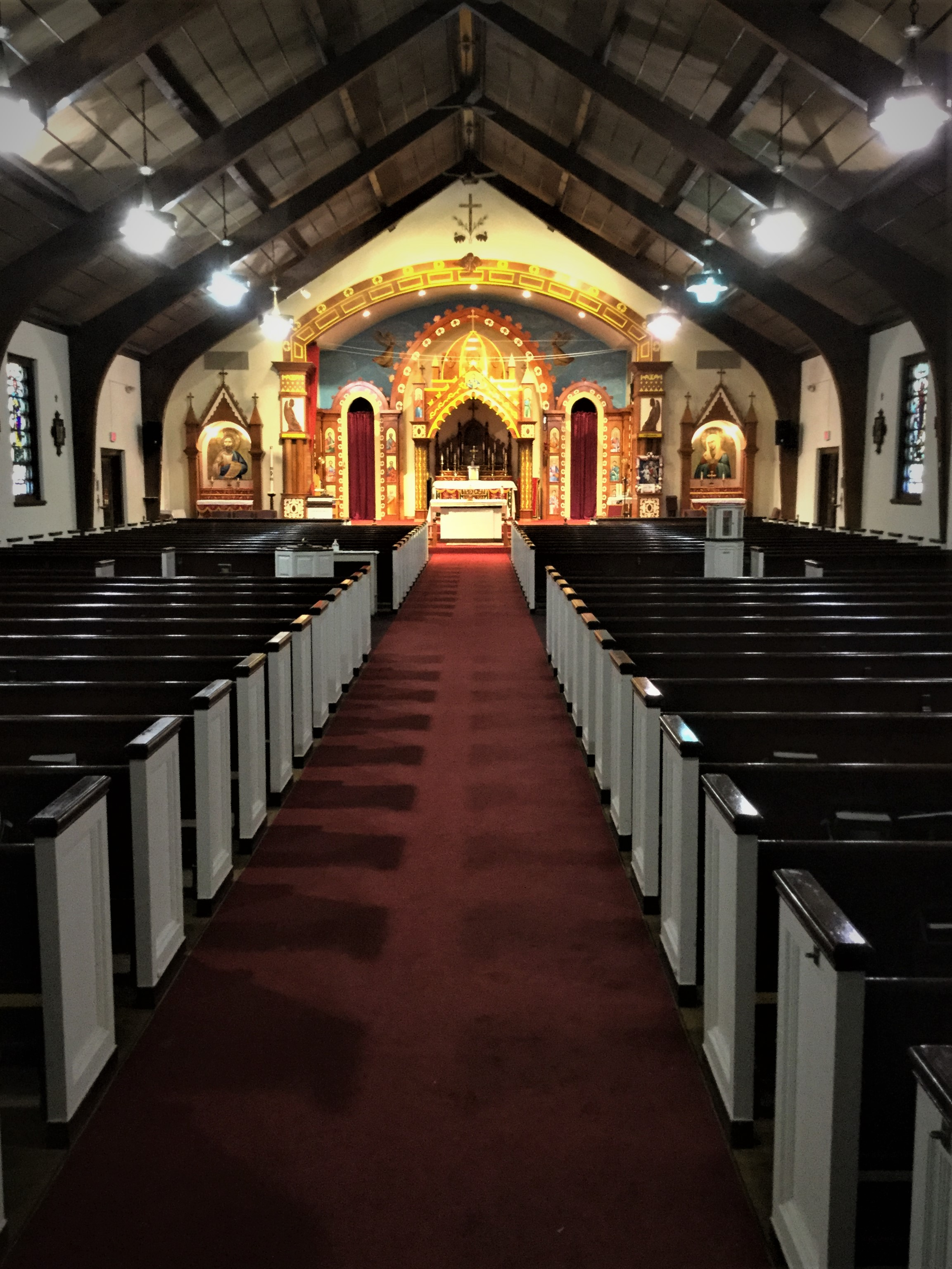
Interior, Cathedral of St Vincent de Paul

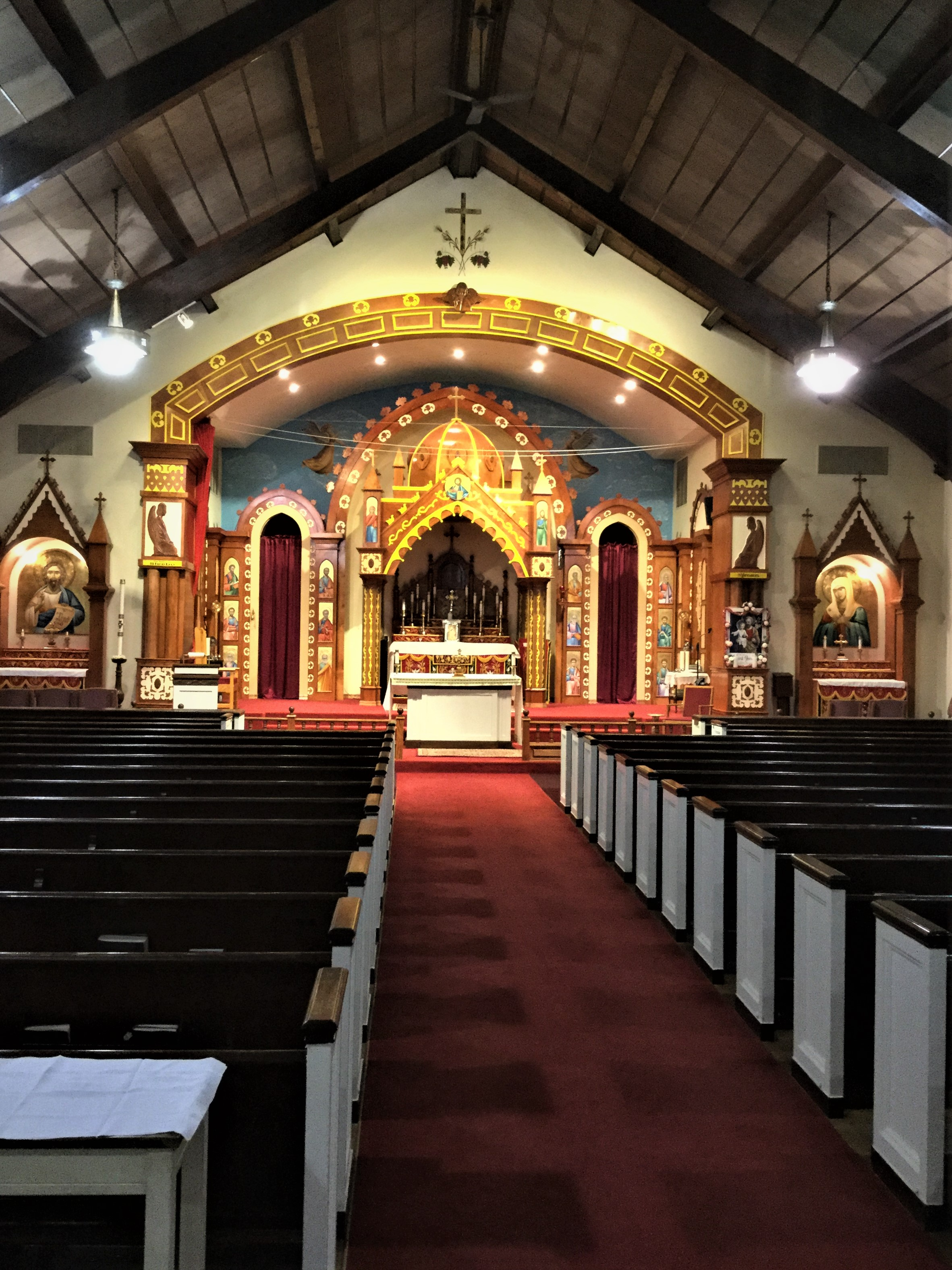
Closeup of the altar

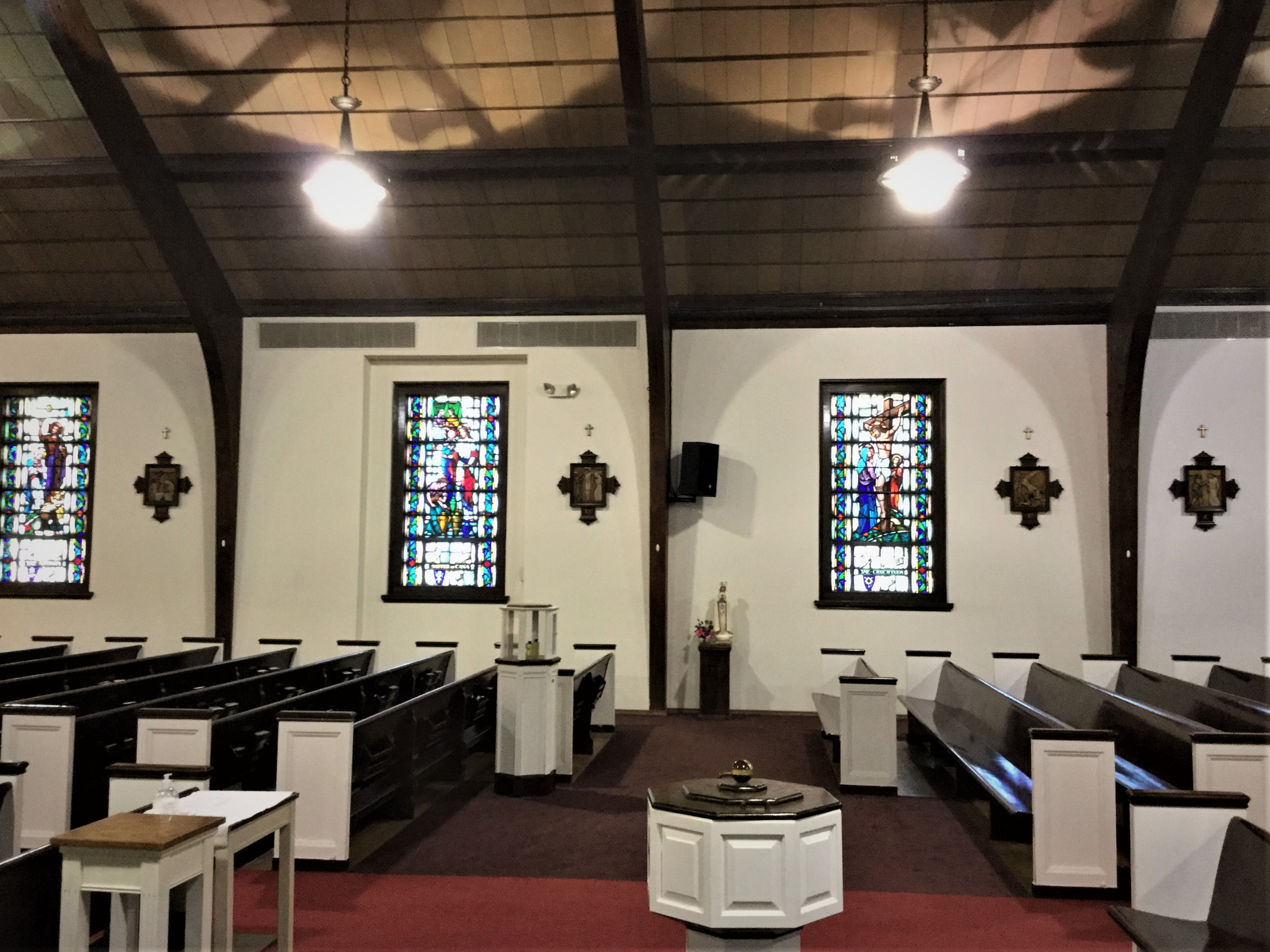
Stained Glass, Cathedral of St Vincent de Paul

== See also ==
- List of cathedrals in New York
- List of Catholic cathedrals in the United States
- List of cathedrals in the United States
