= Geevarghese Chediath =

Fr. Dr. Geevarghese Chediath Malpan (born 1945) is a priest of the Major Archdioicese of Trivandrum of the Syro-Malankara Catholic Church.

== Early life ==
Chediath was born at Athirumkal, Pathanamthitta, Kerala on 29 May 1945. His parents are C. G. Daniel (+ 2004) and Saramma. He had his Seminary Studies at St. Aloysius Seminary, Trivandrum and St. Thomas Apostolic Seminary, Vadavathoor, Kottayam. He was ordained a priest on 20 December 1969.

== Priestly life ==
He was appointed the Secretary to Archbishop Benedict Mar Gregorios. He was the Vice Rector (1970-1973) and later Rector (1993-1996) of St. Aloysius Seminary, Trivandrum. He had his Doctoral Studies at Augustinianum, Rome. He wrote his Doctoral Dissertation on the Christology of Mar Babai the Great (+ 628).

== Academic life ==
He taught at the St. Thomas Apostolic Seminary, Vadavathoor, Kottayam (1979-1993) and is a Permanent Professor of the Pontifical Oriental Institute, Kottayam. He is a Resident Professor at St. Mary’s Malankara Major Seminary, Nalanchira, Trivandrum since 1996. He taught also at the St. Ephrem Ecumenical Research Institute (SEERI), Kottayam and Missionary Orientation Centre (MOC), Kottayam. He was a member of the Pro-Oriente Syriac Commission and is a member of the Forum Syriacum of the Pro-Oriente Foundation. He was one of the Malankara catholic representatives of the Catholic- Malankara Orthodox and Catholic- Syrian Orthodox International Theological Dialogues. He is a consultor of the Synodal Commission for Theology and Publication of the Syro-Malankara Catholic Church.

== Death ==
He was called to eternal life on 21 February 2021. His funeral service was conducted on 25 February 2021.

== Author ==
He has authored 106 books in Malayalam and English on Patrology, Ecumenism and Church History. The Christology of Mar Babai the Great (1982) is his masterpiece. He has also served as the section editor of the Theological Quarterly, Christian Orient. He was the Chancellor of the newly emerged malankara catholic diocese of Pathanamthitta
