= Francis Chullikatt =

Roman Catholic archbishop

His Excellency, The Most Reverend Francis Assisi Chullikatt
- Apostolic Nuncio of Bosnia and Herzegovina and Montenegro; Titular Archbishop of Ostra
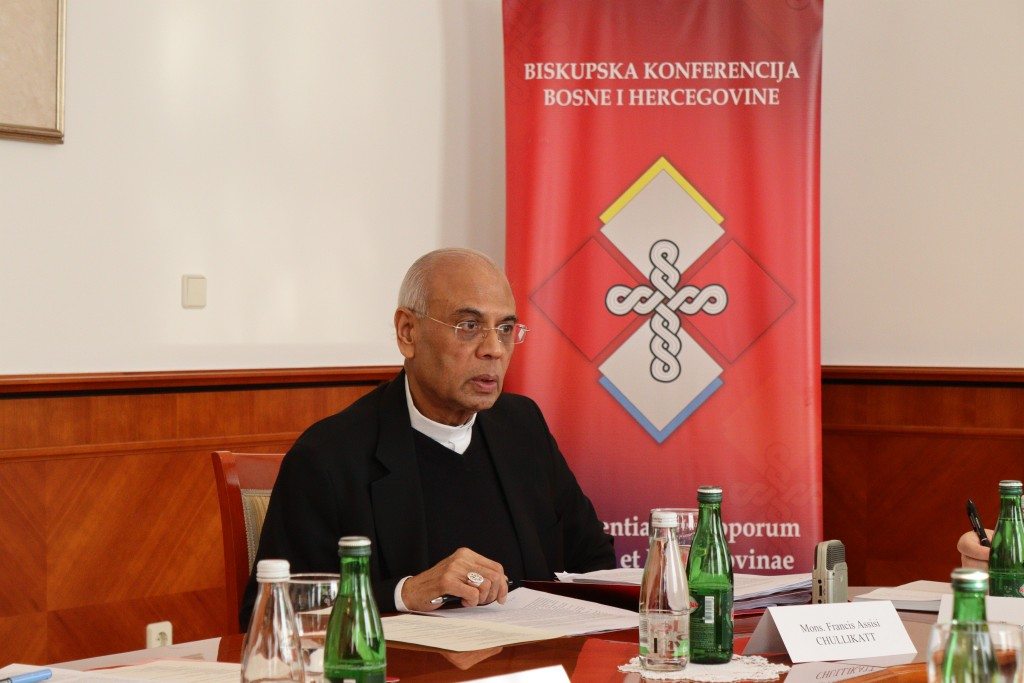
- Appointed: 1 October 2022
- Predecessor: Luigi Pezzuto
- Other post: Titular Archbishop of Ostra
- Previous posts: Apostolic Nuncio of Kazakhstan, Kyrgyzstan and Tajikistan (2016–2022); Permanent Observer of the Holy See to the United Nations (2010–2014); Apostolic Nuncio to Jordan and Iraq (2006–2010)

Orders
- Ordination: 3 June 1978
- Consecration: 25 June 2006 by Giovanni Lajolo, Pedro López Quintana, and Daniel Acharuparambil

Personal details
- Born: 20 March 1953 (age 73) Bolghatty, India
- Motto: FIDEI IN VIRTUTE

Styles of Francis Assisi Chullikatt
- Reference style: His Excellency; The Most Reverend
- Spoken style: Your Excellency
- Religious style: Archbishop

Francis Assisi Chullikatt JCD (born 20 March 1953) is an Indian-born prelate of the Catholic Church. He has been the Apostolic Nuncio to Bosnia and Herzegovina and Montenegro since 1 October 2022. He was the Permanent Observer of the Holy See to the United Nations from 17 July 2010 until 1 July 2014. He previously served as Apostolic Nuncio to Iraq and Jordan, and to Kazakhstan, Tajikistan and Kyrgyzstan from 30 April 2016 until 1 October 2022.

== Early years ==
Chullikatt was born in 1953 in Bolghatty, Kochi, India. He was incardinated in the diocese of Verapoly where he was ordained a priest on 3 June 1978. He continued his studies and received a doctorate in canon law. He speaks English, Italian, French, Spanish and Croatian. He entered the diplomatic service of the Holy See on 15 July 1988. He served in the papal representations in Honduras, in various countries of southern Africa, in the Philippines, at the United Nations in New York from 2000 to 2004, where he served as a Counsellor at the Holy See's Mission to the United Nations and, finally, in the Secretariat of State in the Vatican.

== Diplomatic career ==
=== Nuncio to Iraq and Jordan ===
He was appointed as Apostolic Nuncio to Iraq and Jordan and Titular Archbishop of Ostra on 29 April 2006 by Pope Benedict, having served as the counsellor to the nunciature. He took Fidei in Virtute or "By the power of faith" as his episcopal motto.

In February 2010, Chullikatt said that Christians have often been targets, and especially the Christians of Mosul "have paid a high price, despite their unanimously recognized peaceful life". He continued saying "One has the impression that the reason to attack these minorities is strictly and only their religious faith or their different ethnic membership", the nunciature note continues. "Many Christians live in fear of staying in the territory which has seen them present for 2,000 years." The statement declares that "urgent help is needed: Especially necessary is that the pressure of world opinion not fall, so that all the violence and discrimination ends immediately." The statement suggests the future of minorities depends on international attention. "Moreover, it is hoped that the local authorities will not fail to attempt anything to guarantee the defenseless all the protection to which they are entitled, precisely in virtue of their Iraqi citizenship, which they have never betrayed," it continues. "Christians request that they be able to live their life in tranquility and profess their faith with total security, a basic condition of every civilization."

In March 2010 Chullikatt said that "any attempt to decrease the Christian presence or worse, to destroy the Christian presence in Iraq would mean destroying the history of the Iraqi nation." He noted that all the Christian churches and Christian leaders in the country are involved in interreligious dialogue and are in constant contact with Muslim leaders. Chullikatt said that international solidarity is crucial for the survival of Iraq's minorities, "especially the Christians who are most exposed to the kind of violence taking place now, particularly in Mosul."

In July 2011 in a speech in Kansas City on nuclear disarmament he said: "The simple truth about the use of nuclear weapons is that, being weapons of mass destruction, they cannot comply with fundamental rules of international humanitarian law forbidding the infliction of indiscriminate and disproportionate harm. Nor can their use meet the rigorous standards of the Just War principles' moral assessment of the use of force.... Viewed from a legal, political, security and most of all – moral – perspective, there is no justification for the continued maintenance of nuclear weapons."

=== Permanent Observer of the Holy See to the United Nations ===
Chullikatt was appointed as Permanent Observer of the Holy See to the United Nations by Pope Benedict XVI on 17 July 2010, the first non-Italian to hold the post. He was also named Permanent Observer of the Holy See to the Organization of American States.

In November 2012 Chullikatt welcomed the General Assembly vote which gave majority approval to Palestine becoming a Non-member Observer State of the United Nations. In January 2014 Chullikatt spoke before the United States House Foreign Affairs Subcommittee on Africa, Global Health, Global Human Rights and International Organizations. In April Chullikatt praised the U.N.'s plan to eradicate poverty, emphasising the importance of the family in encouraging development and in fighting poverty. In eradicating poverty "we do not need to reinvent the wheel," Chullikatt said in a 31 March statement. "Setting a development agenda for the next 15 years is a powerful gesture of intergenerational solidarity. The future we want becomes, then, the future we want for our children and our children’s children."

During his service as a permanent observer at the UN, several employees of the Holy See's mission at the UN reported him to the Vatican for underpayment and improper treatment, and only on March 11, 2019, appeared on the portal Crux Now a text titled "Former UN envoy’s tenure described as ‘horror story’ for staff". On 1 July 2014 Chullikatt resigned from his post at the UN without receiving another assignment. He spent a semester as a fellow at Harvard Divinity School.

=== Apostolic Nuncio to Kazakhstan, Tajikistan and Kyrgyzstan ===
He was appointed Apostolic Nuncio to Kazakhstan and Tajikistan on 30 April 2016. He was made Nuncio to Kyrgyzstan as well on 24 June 2016.

=== Apostolic Nuncio to Bosnia and Herzegovina and Montenegro ===
On 1 October 2022, Pope Francis appointed him as Apostolic Nuncio to Bosnia and Herzegovina and Montenegro.

== See also ==
- List of heads of the diplomatic missions of the Holy See

Diplomatic posts
Preceded by Fernando Filoni	Apostolic Nuncio to Iraq; 29 April 2006 – 17 July 2010	Succeeded by Giorgio Lingua
Preceded by Fernando Filoni	Apostolic Nuncio to Jordan; 29 April 2006 – 17 July 2010	Succeeded by Giorgio Lingua
Preceded by Celestino Migliore	Permanent Observer of the Holy See to the United Nations; 17 July 2010 – 1 July 2014	Succeeded by Bernardito Auza
Preceded by Miguel Maury Buendía	Apostolic Nuncio to Kazakhstan; 30 April 2016 – 01 October 2022	Vacant
Preceded by Miguel Maury Buendía	Apostolic Nuncio to Tajikistan; 30 April 2016 – 01 October 2022	Vacant
Preceded by Miguel Maury Buendía	Apostolic Nuncio to Kyrgyzstan; 24 June 2016 – 01 October 2022	Vacant
Preceded by Luigi Pezzuto	Apostolic Nuncio to Bosnia and Herzegovina; 01 October 2022 – present	Incumbent
Preceded by Luigi Pezzuto	Apostolic Nuncio to Montenegro; 01 October 2022 – present	Incumbent
