= George Panamthundil =

Indian prelate of the Catholic Church

His Excellency, The Most Reverend George George Panamthundil
- Apostolic Nuncio to Kazakhstan, Kyrgyzstan and Tajikistan; Titular Archbishop of Floriana
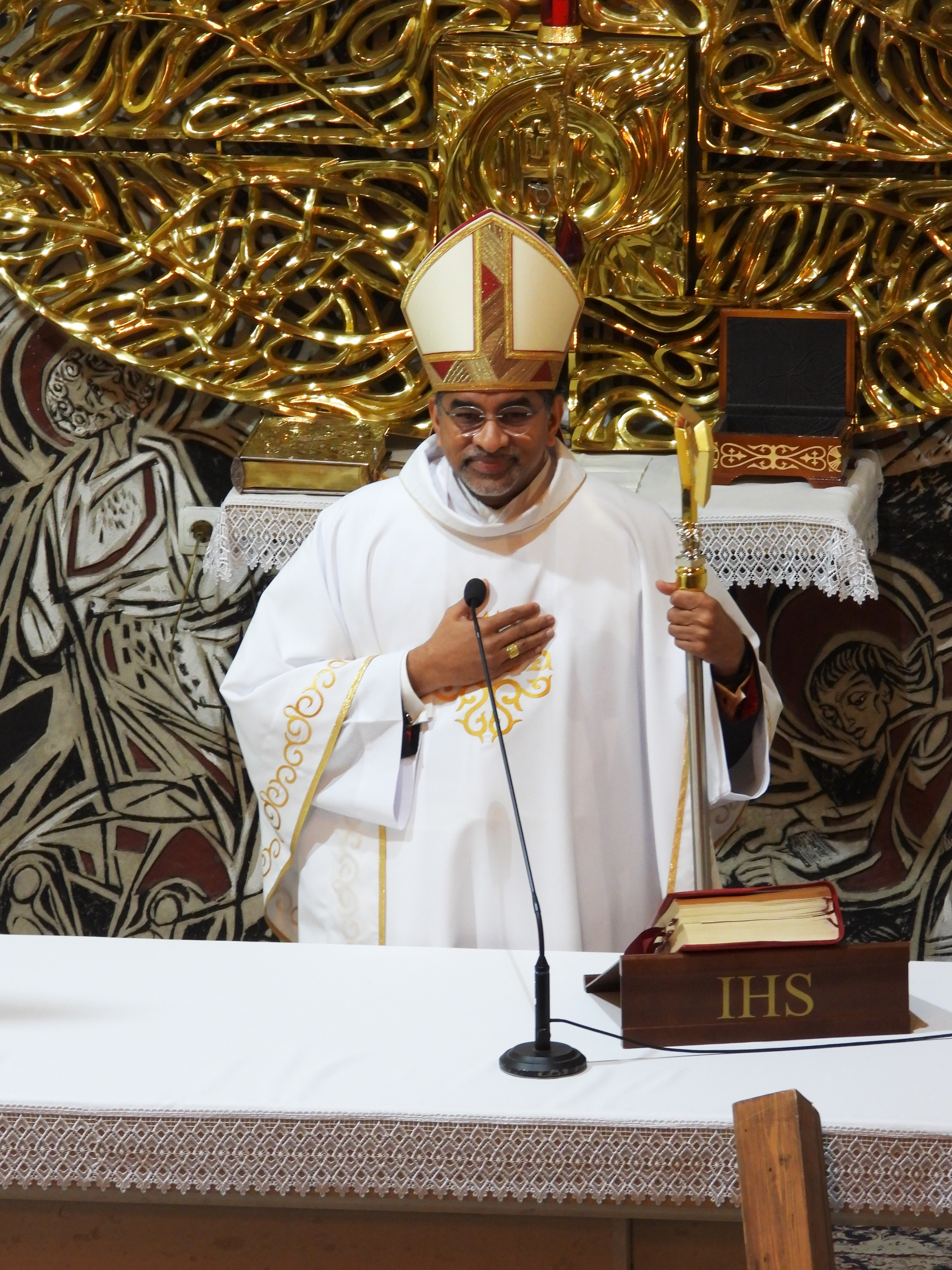
- Appointed: 16 June 2023
- Predecessor: Francis Chullikatt
- Other post: Titular Archbishop of Floriana

Orders
- Ordination: 18 February 1998
- Consecration: 9 September 2023 by Pietro Parolin, Baselios Cleemis and Rubén Salazar Gómez

Personal details
- Born: 20 May 1972 (age 54) Trivandrum, India
- Motto: In Unitate Trinitatis
- Coat of arms

Styles of George George Panamthundil
- Reference style: His Excellency; The Most Reverend
- Spoken style: Your Excellency
- Religious style: Archbishop

George George Panamthundil (born 20 May 1972) is an Indian prelate of the Catholic Church who works in the diplomatic service of the Holy See.

== Biography ==
George Panamthundil was born on 20 May 1972 in Trivandrum, India. He was ordained a priest for the Syro-Malankara Catholic Major Archeparchy of Trivandrum on 18 February 1998. He graduated in oriental canon law and knows French, English, Italian, Portuguese and Spanish.

== Diplomatic career ==
He entered the Holy See Diplomatic Service on 1 July 2005 and has served in the apostolic nunciatures in Costa Rica, Guinea, Iraq, Austria, and Israel, the apostolic delegation in Jerusalem and Palestine, and the Pontifical Representation in Cyprus.

On 16 June 2023, Pope Francis appointed him Titular Archbishop of Floriana and Apostolic Nuncio to Kazakhstan. On 15 July 2023, he was also named apostolic nuncio to Kyrgyzstan and Tajikistan as well. He was consecrated as archbishop on 9 September 2023.

== See also ==
- List of heads of the diplomatic missions of the Holy See
