= Yoohanon Alexios Kuttiyil =

Indian Syro-Malankara Catholic bishop (born 1982)

Mar Yoohanon Alexios
- Auxiliary Bishop of the Major Archeparchy of Trivandrum
- Church: Catholic Church
- Archdiocese: Major Archeparchy of Trivandrum
- Appointed: 19 September 2025

Orders
- Ordination: 2 April 2008
- Consecration: 22 November 2025 by Baselios Cleemis

Personal details
- Born: John Kuttiyil; 30 May 1982 (age 44) Kizhakketheruvu, Kerala, India
- Education: Pontifical Oriental Institute

Yoohanon Alexios Kuttiyil (born 30 May 1982), also styled Yoohanon Mar Alexios, is an Indian Syro-Malankara Catholic hierarch, who currently serves as an Auxiliary Bishop of the Major Archeparchy of Trivandrum in Kerala, India. He was appointed auxiliary bishop in September 2025 and received episcopal consecration in November of the same year.

== Early life and education ==
Yoohanon Alexios Kuttiyil was born on 30 May 1982 in Kizhakketheruvu, in the Kerala state of India. He entered a minor seminary formation at the St. Aloysius Minor Seminary, Trivandrum and leter continued at the St. Mary's Malankara Major Seminary in the Syro-Malankara Catholic Church and completed his philosophical and theological studies at seminaries affiliated with the Major Archeparchy of Trivandrum.

For advanced studies, he pursued a licentiate and later a doctorate in Eastern Canon Law at the Pontifical Oriental Institute in Rome, Italy. These studies prepared him for administrative and judicial responsibilities within the Syro-Malankara Catholic Church.

== Priesthood ==
Kuttiyil was ordained a priest on 2 April 2008 for the Syro-Malankara Catholic Church. During his early priesthood, he served in several parishes and diocesan offices, focusing on pastoral care, catechesis, and seminary formation. He was also involved in coordinating youth ministry programs and in guiding the educational initiatives of the Archeparchy.

== Election and appointment as bishop ==
On 19 September 2025, Pope Leo XIV confirmed decision of the Synod of Bishops of the Syro-Malankara Catholic Church to elected Kuttiyil as an auxiliary bishop of the Major Archeparchy of Trivandrum and appointed him titular bishop of Canatha.

== Episcopal consecration ==
Yoohanon Alexios Kuttiyil was consecrated on 22 November 2025 at St. Mary’s Cathedral in Pattom in Trivandrum, Kerala, together with other newly elected bishop of the Syro-Malankara Catholic Church. The principal consecrator was Baselios Cleemis, Major Archbishop-Catholicos of the Syro-Malankara Catholic Church with Archbishop Thomas Mar Koorilos and Bishop Joseph Mar Thomas, served as co-consecrators.

== Role and responsibilities ==
As Auxiliary Bishop, Kuttiyil assists the Major Archbishop of the Syro-Malankara Catholic Church in pastoral care, liturgical ministry, seminary administration, and other administrative responsibilities within the Syro-Malankara Catholic Major Archeparchy of Trivandrum. He is involved in the formation of priests and religious, oversight of diocesan programs, and coordination with other Eastern Catholic Churches in India.

== See also ==
- Syro-Malankara Catholic Church
- List of Catholic bishops in India

Catholic Church titles
Preceded by Mathews Mar Polycarpos	Titular Bishop of Canatha; 2025–present	Succeeded by Incumbent
Preceded by Mathews Mar Polycarpos	Auxiliary Bishop of the Major Archeparchy of Trivandrum; 2025–present	Succeeded by Incumbent
