= Matthews Polycarpos =

Indian catholic bishop

Mar Matthews Polycarpos
- Bishop of the Syro-Malankara Catholic Eparchy of Mavelikara
- Church: Catholic Church
- Appointed: 30 May 2025
- Installed: 29 June 2025
- Predecessor: Joshua Ignathios
- Previous post: Auxiliary Bishop Major Archeparchy of Trivandrum (2022-2025)

Orders
- Ordination: 18 December 1982 by Benedict Gregorios
- Consecration: 15 July 2022 by Baselios Cleemis

Personal details
- Born: Matthews Manakkarakavil; 10 November 1955 (age 70) Puthoor,Kerala

Matthews Mar Polycarpos (born 10 November 1955) is the Bishop of the Syro Malankara Eparchy of Mavelikara. He succeeded Joshua Mar Ignathios on 29 June 2025 having previously served as the Auxiliary Bishop of the Major Archdiocese of Trivandrum.

== Early life and education ==
Matthews Mar Polycarpos was born as Mathews Manakkarakavil on 10 November 1955 in Puthoor, Kerala. Having completed his studies in philosophy and theology at St Thomas Apostolic Seminary Vadavathoor he was ordained a priest on 18 December 1983 by Benedict Mar Gregorios. He obtained a degree in History from Loyola College Madras, Followed by a PhD in French Literature in 2010 from M.S. University, Tirunelveli, He is the first Malayalee person to have achieved a PhD in French. From 1990 he has been a teacher at Mar Ivanios College later serving a bursar and principal. He was also a member of the Kerala Public Service Commission.

== Episcopate ==
On 5 May 2022 whilst serving as vicar general for the Major Archdiocese of Trivandrum he was appointed as the Auxiliary Bishop for the Major Archdiocese of Trivandrum. His Dayroyo (Ramban) ordination was held on 21 June 2022 and his Episcopal consecration was held on 15 July 2022 in St Mary's Cathedral consecrated by Major Archbishop Mar Baselios Cleemis, Thomas Mar Koorilos and Joshua Mar Ignathios.

On 30 May 2025 Mar Polycarpos was appointed as the second Bishop of the Syro Malankara Eparchy of Mavelikara following the retirement of Joshua Mar Ignathios. His Sunthroniso (Installation) was held on 29 June 2025 at St. Mary's Cathedral, Punnamood.

== Writings ==
In 2021 he published a book called Facets of Love.

Catholic Church titles
Preceded by Maroun Ammar; Position vacant (2017–2022)	Titular Bishop of Canatha; 2022–2025	Succeeded by Yoohanon Mar Alexios
Preceded by Samuel Mar Irenios; Position vacant (2019–2022)	Auxiliary Bishop of the Major Archeparchy of Trivandrum; 2022–2025	Succeeded by Yoohanon Mar Alexios
Preceded by Joshua Mar Ignathios	Bishop of the Syro-Malankara Eparchy of Mavelikara; 2025–present	Succeeded by Incumbent
