= Apostolic Nunciature to Kazakhstan =

Diplomatic post of the Holy See

The Apostolic Nunciature to Kazakhstan is an ecclesiastical office of the Catholic Church in Kazakhstan. It is a diplomatic post of the Holy See, whose representative is called the Apostolic Nuncio with the rank of an ambassador.

Its office is located in Astana, Kazakhstan. The Apostolic Nuncio to Kazakhstan is usually also the Apostolic Nuncio to Kyrgyzstan and Tajikistan upon his appointment to said nations.

== List of papal representatives to Kazakhstan ==
Apostolic Nuncios

- Marian Oleś (9 April 1994 – 11 December 2001)
- Józef Wesołowski (6 November 2002 – 24 January 2008)
- Miguel Maury Buendía (19 May 2008 - 5 December 2015)
- Francis Assisi Chullikatt (30 April 2016 – 1 October 2022)
- George Panamthundil (16 June 2023 – present)
