= Geevarghese Panicker =

Indian Catholic priest (1924-2008)

Rev. Dr. Geevarghese Panicker
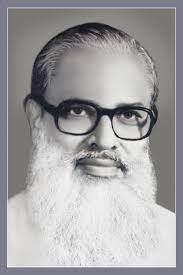
- Fr. C.T Geevarghese Panicker

Orders
- Ordination: 24 August 1949 by Geevarghese Mar Ivanios

Personal details
- Born: 1 April 1924 Karichal, Alappuzha, Kerala
- Died: 28 December 2008 (aged 84) Perzhumpuzha, Kollam, Kerala
- Buried: St.George's Malankara Catholic Church, Paranthal

Geevarghese Panicker (1924–2008) was a priest, teacher, guide, and educationalist of Syro-Malankara Catholic Church.

== Early life ==
Panicker was born on 1 April 1924 at Karichal, Alappuzha as the eldest son to K. G. Thomas Panicker (Kezhakeveetil) and Achiyamma Thomas Panicker (Kaithayil-Kallupara). He was the eldest of seven children.

He is the grand Nephew of the Archbishop Geevarghese Mar Ivanios, the founder of Syro-Malankara Catholic Church, also known as the 'Newman of India'.

== Education ==
Panicker had his primary education at Vazhathattu Primary School, Karichal, Alappuzha and middle school at St. James English Middle School, Karuvatta, Alappuzha. He completed his High school final under the guidance of Kainikkara Kumara Pillai at N.S.S. English High School, Karuvatta, Alappuzha.

After school education, he joined St. Aloysius Seminary, Thiruvananthapuram on his own volition under the guidance of Archbishop Geevarghese Mar Ivanios in 1940.

He received his B.A. honours in English Language and Literature from University of Travancore, Thiruvananthapuram. His received his master's degree in both Philosophy and Theology from the Papal Seminary, Kandy, Ceylon, where he underwent training for priesthood.

He was ordained a priest on 24 August 1949 by Archbishop Geevarghese Mar Ivanios at Papal Seminary, Kandy, Ceylon.

He received his Doctorate in English Literature at Catholic University of America, Washington, D.C., United States in 1958.

== Educationalist ==
Panicker started his teaching career as a lecturer at Mar Ivanios College, Thiruvananthapuram.

It was noted as the 'Golden years of Mar Ivanios College' by the Late Education Minister of Kerala, C. H. Mohammed Koya. Fr.Panicker also held many positions in the Senate and Syndicate of the University of Kerala. He also headed the Principals of Catholic College council at the University of Kerala.

== Notable students ==
- T.M. Jacob - Minister of Education of Kerala from 1982 to 1987
- K. Muraleedharan - Indian National Congress politician and lawyer.
- Jagathy Sreekumar - actor, director, and playback singer
- Jayakumar - former Chief Secretary of Kerala
- Shri Jagadeesh - A Secretary in the Government of Kerala's Department of Tourism.

== Seminary rector ==
After his retirement from Mar Ivanios College, Panicker was appointed by the Bishops' Council of Kerala as Rector and President of St. Joseph's Pontifical Seminary, Mangalapuzha, Aluva, which before its bifurcation, had a student strength of more than 700 clerics.

Panicker’s tenure as Rector was for two consecutive terms of three years each (1979–1985). Many of his students and co-priests have been ordained Bishops.

Then he went on to become the Rector of the newly established St. Mary’s Malankara Major Seminary, Thiruvananthapuram, of the Malankara Catholic Church, dedicated to the Blessed Virgin Mary. He played a major role in its establishment and progress.

== Final years ==
His final field of activity for 18 years from 1987 to 2005 was at SEERI (St. Ephrem Ecumenical Research Institute), Kottayam where he served as dean of studies.

== Author ==
Panicker wrote a number of articles on theology and liturgy.

His main works are:

- An Historical Introduction to the Syriac Liturgy (1989)
- The Church in the Syriac Tradition (1990).

== Death ==
Panicker died on 28 December 2008 at Assisi Atonement Hospital, Perzhumpuzha, Kollam. His body was interred in St. George Syro-Malankara Catholic Church at Paranthal, Adoor. Major Archbishop of Syro-Malankara Catholic Church, Moran Mor Baselios Cardinal Cleemis Catholicos led the funeral service at Paranthal; he was buried near to his parents as per his request.
