= St. John's Leprosy and HIV Care Services =

St. John's Leprosy and HIV Care Services is a charitable undertaking of the Major Archieparchy of Trivandrum of the Syro-Malankara Catholic Church.

At present the hospital is giving shelter for 50 leprosy patients. In the rehabilitation centre, some 20 HIV/Aids patients are getting care and treatment. Fr. Jose Kizhakkedath is the current director of St. John’s Health Services.

== History ==
In the early 1960s, there was a leprosy clinic at Koppam run by the Church of South India. The programme of the clinic was carried out by Miss Dunn from England. In the beginning of 1963, Miss Dunn was looking for some agency to carry out the work and she met late Archbishop Benedict Mar Gregorios. He agreed to carry out this noble work. That was the beginning of St. John’s Health Services, Pirappencode. Fr. Lawrence J. Thottam (later Lawrence Mar Epraem) joined the Health Services as the first Director of St. John’s Health Services in 1963. Sisters of Imitation of Christ (Bethany Madhom) and Little Sisters of Jesus took up the Community Services of the centre. St.John’s Hospital was formally inaugurated on 15 February 1964 by Health Minister Mr. Willington and the late Archbishop Benedict Mar Gregorios. In 1999, the Leprosy & TB Control Program was launched at Trivandrum City Corporation under the leadership of this Hospital. On 5 July 2007, Kerala State AIDS Control Society recognized St. John’s Health Centre as a community care centre for HIV/AIDS.

== Sources ==
- Manual of St. John's Health Services
