= Syro-Malankara Catholic Eparchy of Mavelikara =

Eastern Catholic eparchy in Kerala, India

Coordinates: 9.2669°N 76.5500°E

Eparchy of Mavelikara Eparchia Mavelikarensis

Location
- Country: India
- Ecclesiastical province: Major Archdiocese of Trivandrum

Statistics
- Area: 4,048 km^{2} (1,563 sq mi)
- Population: Total; Catholics: (as of 2023); 2,542,000; 28,300 (1.1%)
- Parishes: 96

Information
- Denomination: Syro-Malabar Church
- Sui iuris church: Syro-Malabar Church
- Rite: East Syriac Rite
- Established: 2 January 2007; 19 years ago
- Cathedral: St Mary's Church, Punnamoodu, Mavelikara.
- Secular priests: 81 (67 Diocesan, 14 Religious Orders)

Current leadership
- Pope: Leo XIV
- Major Archbishop: Baselios Cleemis
- Eparch: Matthews Polycarpos
- Bishops emeritus: Joshua Ignathios

The Eparchy of Mavelikara is a Syro-Malankara Catholic Church ecclesiastical territory or Eparchy of the Catholic Church in India. It is a suffragan eparchy in the ecclesiastical province of the metropolitan Archeparchy of Trivandrum.

Its episcopal see is Mavelikkara, a taluk and municipality in the southern part of Alappuzha district of the southwestern Indian state of Kerala, on the banks of the Achankovil River.

It has 94 parishes and 37,000 members. Patron saint is the Blessed Virgin Mary, to whom the cathedral is also devoted. On the 30th May 2025 Mathews Mar Polycarpos was appointed the second Bishop following the retirement of Joshua Mar Ignathios. His Installation was held on the 29th June 2025.

== Territorial History ==
- 2 January 2007: Erected as the Eparchy of Mavelikara on territory split from the Major Archeparchy of Trivandrum.

== Ordinaries ==
Eparchs of Mavelikara (East Syriac Rite)

- Joshua Ignathios (2 January 2007 – 30 May 2025), retired
- Matthews Polycarpos (30 May 2025 – Present)
