= Yoohanon Mar Chrysostom =

Bishop of Pathanamthitta

His Excellency Yoohanon Mar Chrysostom
- Bishop of Pathanamthitta
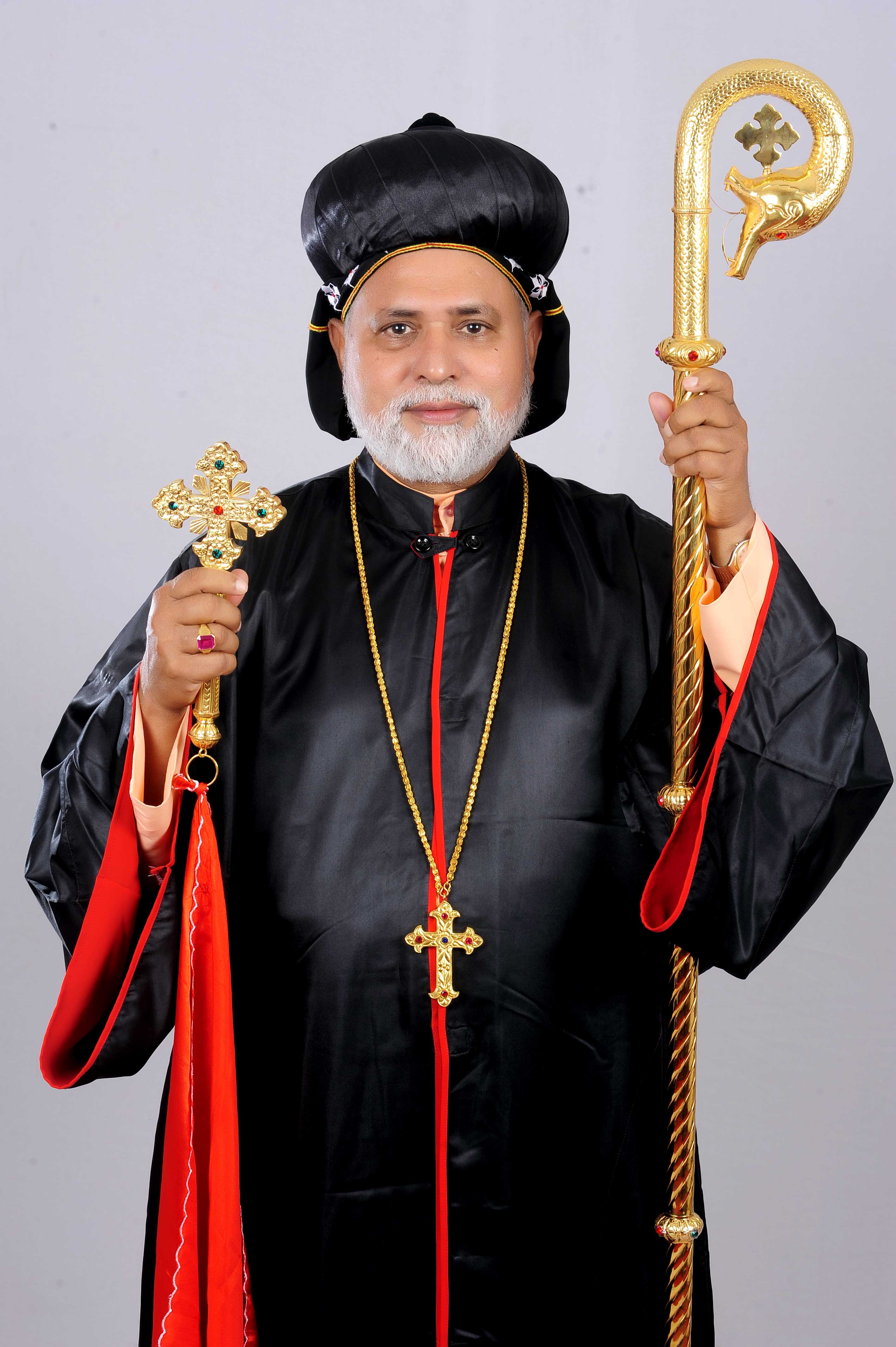
- Church: Syro-Malankara Catholic Church
- See: Eparchy of Pathanamthitta
- In office: 2010–2019
- Successor: Samuel Mar Irenios

Orders
- Ordination: 5 May 1973 (Kashesho), 29 June 1998 (Bishop)

Personal details
- Born: 19 May 1944 (age 82) Kadammanitta, Pathanamthitta District, Kerala

His Excellency Most Rev. Yoohanon Mar Chrysostom (born 19 May 1944) was the second bishop of the Eparchy of Marthandom (1998–2010) and the first bishop of the Eparchy of Pathanamthitta (2010–2019) of the Syro-Malankara Catholic Church. He retired from Pathanamthitta on 7 June 2019 and was succeeded by Samuel Irenios Kattukallil. He is currently Bishop Emeritus.

== Family and Education ==
Mar Chrysostom was the third son of Abraham and Achiyamma of the Kalloor family of Kadammanitta, in Pathanamthitta District. He received secondary education at Government High School, Kadammanitta did minor seminary at St. Aloysius Seminary, Trivandrum, and philosophy and theology at St. Paul's Seminary, Tiruchirappalli (Trichy).

== Ministry ==
Mar Chrysostom was ordained a priest by Benedict Mar Gregorios on 5 May 1973. He began pastoral ministry as an assistant vicar in the parishes around Balaramapuram. Later he became parochial vicar of Venniyoor, Mulloor, Chowara, and Vizhinjam, and later still director of St. Johns Leprosy and HIV Care Services at Pirappancode.

When the Malankara Catholic Mission in North America was inaugurated, Kalloor was appointed co-ordinator and spent time ministering in the Archdiocese of Washington. Based at Holy Comforter-St. Cyprian parish in Washington, DC, he was a chaplain for DC General Hospital and coordinated ministry for Syro-Malankara rite Catholics in the United States. In 1997 he was made chorbishop.

Pope John Paul II appointed Mar Chrysostom as the second bishop of the Eparchy of Marthandom on 16 April 1998. He was ordained a bishop with the name Yoohanon Mar Chrysostom by Archbishop Cyril Mar Baselios at Mar Ivanios Stadium, Trivandrum, on 29 June 1998. He was installed as the bishop of Marthandom on 1 July 1998 at Marthandom Cathedral.

Yoohanon Mar Chrysostom was appointed the first bishop of the newly erected Eparchy of Pathanamthitta on 25 January 2010 and enthroned on 20 March 2010. He served until retiring on 7 June 2019.

Catholic Church titles
Preceded by Lawrence Ephrem	Bishop of the Syro-Malankara Catholic Eparchy of Marthandom; 1998–2010	Succeeded by Vincent Mar Paulos
Preceded by Position established	Bishop of the Syro-Malankara Eparchy of Pathanamthitta; 2010–2019	Succeeded by Samuel Mar Irenios
