= Thomas Eusebius =

Indian Catholic bishop (born 1961)

His Grace, The Most Reverend Aboon Thomas Mar Eusebius
- Eparch of Parassala
- Church: Syro-Malankara Catholic Church
- Diocese: Syro-Malankara Catholic Eparchy of the United States of America and Canada
- Appointed: August 5, 2017
- Installed: September 23, 2017
- Predecessor: First Eparch
- Previous posts: Professor of philosophy at St. Mary’s Malankara Major Seminary; Apostolic Exarch of Syro-Malankara Catholic Eparchy of the United States of America and Canada; Titular Bishop of Lares; Eparch of St. Mary, Queen of Peace

Orders
- Ordination: December 29, 1986 (Kasheeso) by Benedict Varghese Gregorios Thangalathil, O.I.C.
- Consecration: September 21, 2010 (Episcopo) by Baselios Cleemis, Joseph Thomas Konnath, and Joshuah Ignathios Kizhakkeveettil

Personal details
- Born: 6 June 1961 (age 65) Mylapra, Kerala

Styles of Aboon Thomas Mar Eusebius
- Reference style: His Grace; The Most Reverend
- Spoken style: His Grace
- Religious style: Eparch

Aboon Thomas Mar Eusebius (born Thomas Naickamparampil June 6, 1961) is serving as the first bishop of the Syro-Malankara Catholic Eparchy in the United States. A senior priest of the state Christian clergy, he was serving as the first exarch of the Malankara Syrian Catholic Exarchate since his enthronement on October 3, 2010. On August 5, 2017, Baselios Cardinal Cleemis, the Major Archbishop-Catholicos of the Malankara Catholic Church, announced that Eusebius would be the first Bishop of the new Malankara Diocese of Parassala, India.

== Biography ==
=== Early life and education ===
Thomas Naickamparampil was born in Mylapra in the state of Kerala. His home parish is Sacred Heart Malankara Catholic Church, Mylapra.

He obtained a master's degree in philosophy from Jnana-Deepa Vidyapeeth, Pune and Doctorate in Philosophy from the Pontifical Gregorian University, Rome. The Gregorian University published his doctoral thesis. He speaks Malayalam, English, German, Italian and Hindi and knows Syriac, Greek and French.

=== Ordination and ministry ===
Eusebius was ordained priest for Syro-Malankara Catholic Church on December 29, 1986. After his ordination he held the following positions: assistant pastor and pastor in several communities, then dean and professor of philosophy at St. Mary's Malankara Major Seminary.

He served as Secretary-General of the Archbishop of the Syro-Malankara, Public Relations Officer, Coordinator for Interreligious Dialogue and Secretary of the council of priests. He was also the director of Sarvodaya Vidyalaya, a school in Trivandrum.

=== Syro-Malankara Catholic Exarch ===
Eusebius was appointed as the first exarch of the Syro-Malankara Catholic Exarchate in the United States on July 14, 2010 and at the same time Titular Bishop of Lares. He is concurrently the priest apostolic visitator for Syro-Malankara Catholics in Canada and Europe. As such he is the papal representative who is charged with familiarising himself with the situation of a given community and reporting on its status to the Vatican. Eusebius received the tonsuring to remban (rabban in syriac) on Saturday, September 11, 2010 at Sacred Heart Malankara Catholic Church, Mylapra.

He was ordained bishop on September 21, 2010 at St. Mary's Malankara Syrian Catholic Cathedral, Trivandrum. His installation ceremony was on October 3, 2010 at Kellenberg Memorial High School, Uniondale, New York, United States.

== Apostolic Exarchate ==
An apostolic exarchate in the Eastern Catholic Church is the equivalent of an apostolic vicariate in the Latin church - it is created for the pastoral care of Catholics in an area outside the territory of the Eastern Catholic Church to which they belong.

In North America, there are 16 Syro-Malankara parishes and 15 churches serving about 10,000 Syro-Malankara Faithful. There are 30 priests and 34 women religious who minister to them. Syro-Malankara Catholics first began to migrate to the United States in the 1960s and 1970s, but did not have their own Congregations until 1984, settling first in the New York and Philadelphia Metropolitan Areas.

== Published works ==
- THROUGH SELF-DISCOVERY TO SELF-TRANSCENDENCE. A Study of Cognitional Self-Appropriation in Bernard Lonergan (ISBN 8876527508 / 9788876527500)

== See also ==
- East Syriac Rite
- Syriac Christianity
- Terms for Syriac Christians
- West Syriac Rite
- Catholic Church hierarchy
- Catholic Church in the United States
- Historical list of the Catholic bishops of the United States
- List of Catholic bishops of the United States
- Lists of patriarchs, archbishops, and bishops

== Episcopal succession ==
Catholic Church titles
Preceded by First Eparch	Eparch of Parassala; 2017-Present	Succeeded by Incumbent
Preceded by First Eparch	Eparch of St. Mary, Queen of Peace; 2016-2017	Succeeded by Philippos Stephanos Thottathil
