= Syro-Malankara Catholic Eparchy of Parassala =

Syro-Malankara Catholic eparchy in India

Eparchy of Parassala Eparchia Parassalanus

Location
- Country: India
- Ecclesiastical province: Trivandrum

Information
- Denomination: Catholic Church
- Sui iuris church: Syro-Malankara Catholic Church
- Rite: Syro-Malankara Rite
- Established: 5 August 2017

Current leadership
- Pope: Leo XIV
- Major Archbishop: Moran Mor Baselios Cleemis Catholicos
- Eparch: Thomas Mar Eusebius

The Eparchy of Parassala is a Syro-Malankara Catholic Church ecclesiastical territory or eparchy of the Catholic Church in India.

Found mainly in India, the Syro-Malankara Church is one of 23 "sui iuris" or "independent" Eastern Catholic Churches that are in full communion with the Catholic Church in Rome.

It was established by Pope Francis on 5 August 2017 to cater to around 30,750 Syro-Malankara Catholics in Tamil Nadu and Kerala, as well as 220,000 Christians of other rites and denominations in the wider area.

Its first and current eparch is Thomas Mar Eusebius. The Eparchy of Parassala is a suffragan eparchy in the ecclesiastical province of the metropolitan Archeparchy of Trivandrum.
