= Józef Wesołowski =

Polish prelate

- Former Titular Archbishop of Slebte
- Church: Catholic Church
- In office: 3 November 1999–27 June 2014
- Previous post(s): Apostolic Nuncio to Bolivia (1999–2002); Apostolic Nuncio to Kazakhstan, Tajikistan, Kyrgyzstan, Uzbekistan (2002–2008); Apostolic Nuncio to Dominican Republic (2008–2013)

Orders
- Ordination: 21 May 1972 by Karol Wojtyła
- Consecration: 6 January 2000 by Pope John Paul II
- Laicized: 2014

Personal details
- Born: 15 July 1948; Nowy Targ, Lesser Poland Voivodeship, Poland
- Died: 27 August 2015 (aged 67); Vatican City, Vatican City State

Józef Wesołowski (15 July 1948 – 27 August 2015) was a Polish prelate of the Roman Catholic Church. He was an archbishop from 2000 until being laicized by the Holy See in 2014. He was the Apostolic Nuncio to the Dominican Republic from January 2008 until he was recalled in August 2013. Authorities in the Dominican Republic were investigating allegations of child abuse against him. In June 2015, the Vatican announced he would stand trial on charges of possessing child pornography, for which he faced a possible prison term. He died on 27 August 2015 of a heart attack before going to trial.

== Career ==
Wesołowski was born in Nowy Targ, now a part of Lesser Poland Voivodeship, on 15 July 1948. He was ordained a Catholic priest in Kraków on 21 May 1972 by Cardinal Karol Wojtyła, the future Pope John Paul II. He earned a degree in canon law. To prepare for a career as a diplomat, he studied at the Pontifical Ecclesiastical Academy beginning in 1976. He joined the diplomatic service of the Holy See on 25 March 1980. His early assignments took him to Southern Africa, Costa Rica, Japan, Switzerland, India and Denmark.

Pope John Paul II appointed him a titular archbishop and apostolic nuncio to Bolivia on 3 November 1999 and consecrated him a bishop on 6 January 2000. In 2002, Pope John Paul appointed him nuncio to four Central Asian countries: Kazakhstan and Tajikistan on 16 February, Kyrgyzstan on 6 July, and Uzbekistan on 6 November. On 24 January 2008, Pope Benedict XVI named him Apostolic Nuncio to the Dominican Republic and Apostolic Delegate to Puerto Rico.

== Investigations ==
On 21 August 2013, Wesołowski was dismissed by Pope Francis and left the Dominican Republic immediately. Initial news reports from Italy attributed the departure of Wesołowski to a three-year dispute between the latter and Roberto González Nieves, Archbishop of San Juan de Puerto Rico. Cardinal Nicolás de Jesús López Rodríguez, Archbishop of Santo Domingo, told the press on 27 August that Wesołowski was "a great friend and a great advocate of peace". He said that the dispute between Wesołowski and González arose from the latter's support for Puerto Rican independence.

On 2 September 2013, Dominican investigative journalist Nuria Piera reported that Wesołowski had been dismissed because he was involved in the sexual abuse of minors. By then it was believed that Wesołowski had left the Dominican Republic. The next day, Agripino Núñez Collado, Rector of the Pontifical Catholic University Mother and Teacher, said that Wesołowski had been recalled to the Vatican because of child abuse allegations. A spokesman for the Catholic Bishops Conference of the Dominican Republic then disavowed Núñez Collado's statement and called Wesołowski's summons to Rome "routine". He called the allegations of child abuse by Wesołowski "rumors" and added that "there is no evidence against Wesołowski".

On 4 September 2013, Dominican Republic authorities launched an investigation into Wesołowski's conduct. The Vatican confirmed that Vatican officials were conducting their own investigation into Wesołowski and that he had been recalled. A Vatican spokesperson denied that child abuse itself was the basis for the recall, but said the allegations were serious enough to suspend Wesołowski during the investigation. Local church leaders later denied that Wesołowski was being investigated for child abuse and described his recall as an administrative procedure.

A priest accused along with Wesołowski, Father Wojciech Gil, had returned home to Poland, and Dominican investigators provided their Polish counterparts with extensive documentation of criminal allegations against him in September, since Poland and the Dominican Republic have no extradition treaty. Gil had been suspended from his duties at the nunciature in May 2013 while on vacation in his native Poland. He has said the charges against him were the work of drug gangsters opposed to his educational work. Polish officials arrested Gil on 17 February 2014. (Note: At trial on 20 March 2015, Gil offered to serve seven years in prison, using a Polish court procedure that allows a defendant to propose a punishment after pleading guilty. He faced confinement for as long as 15 years on multiple charges of sexual molestation of boys younger than 15. On 25 March, Gil was sentenced to seven years in jail and ordered to pay his victims $42,000 in compensation.)

In January 2014 there were reports that the Vatican had refused to extradite Wesołowski to his native Poland, based on the Vatican's reply to an inquiry from the District Prosecutor's Office in Warsaw that said: "Archbishop Wesołowski is a citizen of the Vatican, and Vatican law does not allow for his extradition." According to Vatican spokesperson Father Federico Lombardi, no extradition request had been made and the Vatican, Poland, and the Dominican Republic were cooperating with one another. He said that Wesołowski is subject to a canonical investigation by the Congregation for the Doctrine of the Faith and possible outcomes could include his laicization. He also said that criminal charges to be tried in a Vatican court were a possibility.

== Vatican proceedings ==
On 27 June 2014, the Vatican Press Office announced that the first stage of the canonical trial of Wesołowski had ended with his laicisation. A laicized cleric is forbidden to exercise ministerial functions under nearly all circumstances. In general, any exercise of his power to administer the Sacraments is considered valid but illicit, except in extraordinary circumstances.

On the following 23 September, the Vatican held an opening hearing in criminal proceedings against Wesołowski. Because of his health, he remained under house arrest for the duration of the trial rather than under more restrictive detention. According to Lombardi, Wesołowski no longer enjoyed diplomatic immunity and was subject to any judicial procedures that may have been brought against him. According to a report prepared by investigators for the prosecutors, thousands of sexually explicit photographs and videos were found on computers he used. They used technical data they recovered to reconstruct Wesołowski's contacts in the course of his diplomatic career.

Gian Piero Milano, the Vatican's Promoter of Justice, and Francisco Domínguez Brito, the Attorney General of the Dominican Republic, discussed Wesołowski's case before Pope Francis met with Dominguez Brito on December 3, who told the Pope he and Milano had "looked into the procedures, legal competencies and steps to follow, in line with Vatican criminal procedures". According to the Pope's spokesman, Francis "underlined that the institutions of both judicial systems must act with complete freedom and within the law".

Wesołowski was indicted in June 2015 by a Vatican prosecutor for possessing child pornography, with a trial date set for 11 July. The trial was postponed on 11 July because of an "unexpected illness" which put Wesołowski into intensive care.

== Death ==
Wesołowski was found dead in his residence in the Vatican on 27 August 2015. A Vatican statement said that he likely died of natural causes. An initial autopsy by a team of doctors identified the cause of death as a heart attack, and the final autopsy confirmed the death was due to natural causes. His funeral Mass on 31 August used the form for members of the laity. It was celebrated by Archbishop Konrad Krajewski, the papal almoner.

The Vatican was inconsistent in its references to Wesołowski. The announcement of his death omitted his clerical title and referred to him as "former apostolic Nuncio", while the final autopsy used the title "Monsignor".

== Notes ==
Catholic Church titles
| Preceded by Terrence Prendergast, S.J. | Titular Bishop of Slebte; 1999–2014 | Vacant |
Diplomatic posts
| Preceded by Rino Passigato | Apostolic Nuncio to Bolivia; 1999–2002 | Succeeded by Ivo Scapolo |
| Preceded by Marian Oleś | Apostolic Nuncio to Kazakhstan, Kyrgyzstan and Tajikistan; 2002–2008 | Succeeded by Miguel Maury Buendía |
| Preceded by Marian Oleś | Apostolic Nuncio to Uzbekistan; 2002–2008 | Succeeded by Antonio Mennini |
| Preceded by Timothy Broglio | Apostolic Nuncio to the Dominican Republic; 2008–2013 | Succeeded by Jude Thaddeus Okolo |
