= Marian Oleś =

Polish prelate

- Apostolic Nuncio to Slovenia & North Macedonia
- Church: Catholic Church
- In office: 11 December 2001 – 1 May 2002
- Predecessor: Edmond Farhat
- Successor: Giuseppe Leanza
- Other post: Titular Archbishop of Ratiaria (1987-2005)
- Previous posts: Apostolic Nuncio to Tajikistan (1996-2001); Apostolic Nuncio to Uzbekistan, Kyrgyzstan, & Kazakhstan (1994-2001); Apostolic Pro-Nuncio to Iraq (1987-1994); Apostolic Pro-Nuncio to Kuwait (1987-1991)

Orders
- Ordination: 9 July 1961
- Consecration: 6 January 1988 by Pope John Paul II

Personal details
- Born: 8 December 1934 Miastkowo, Białystok Voivodeship, Poland
- Died: 24 May 2005 (aged 70) Warsaw, Poland

Marian Oleś (8 December 1934 – 24 May 2005) was a Polish prelate of the Catholic Church who worked in the diplomatic service of the Holy See and in the Roman Curia.

== Biography ==
Marian Oleś was born on 8 December 1934 in Gmina Miastkowo, Poland. As a boy he was exiled from Poland with his family by the Soviets and they lived in Siberia, Persia and India, and his early education was in India and England.

He was ordained a priest on 9 July 1961.

He joined the diplomatic service of the Holy See and his first postings were to Ecuador, Indonesia, Iran, and Portugal. He then spent ten years in Rome working at the Congregation for Bishops.

On 28 November 1987, Pope John Paul II appointed him Titular Archbishop of Ratiaria and Apostolic Pro-Nuncio in Iraq and in Kuwait. He received his episcopal consecration from John Paul on 6 January 1988.

His tenure based in Baghdad, Iraq, coincided with the final months of the Iran-Iraq War and, after a brief period of peace, the Gulf War.

On 9 April 1994, John Paul appointed him Apostolic Nuncio to Kazakhstan, Kyrgyzstan, and Uzbekistan. He became Apostolic Nuncio on 28 December 1996 to Tajikistan as well.

He believed the people of Central Asia were tied to religious communities by tradition rather than commitment and told an interviewer: "I do not like to use terms, like "Christians," "Orthodox," or "Muslims." I prefer to talk about people who come from a Christian tradition or a Muslim tradition, because I think that most people in Central Asia have not yet decided to which religion they want to belong." He identified language as a key barrier to evangelization: "With a few exceptions, none of the priests master any of the local languages. Some of them speak Russian very well. Almost none of them speak the languages of Kazakhstan, Kyrgyzstan, Tadzhikistan, Uzbekistan, and Turkmenistan. This is a problem-- and a great problem."

Pope John Paul visited Kazakhstan while Oleś was nuncio there.

On 11 December 2001, John Paul appointed him apostolic nuncio to Macedonia and Slovenia.

Oleś ended his service as nuncio in May 2002 upon the appointment of Giuseppe Leanza to succeed him in Macedonia and Slovenia.

Three years later, Archbishop Marian Oleś died unexpectedly on May 24, 2005, in Warsaw at the age of 70, after 44 years as a priest and 18 years as a bishop. He was buried at Powązki Cemetery in Warsaw.
