= Apostolic Nunciature to Tajikistan =

Diplomatic mission of the Holy See in Central Asia

The Apostolic Nunciature to Tajikistan is an ecclesiastical office of the Catholic Church in Tajikistan. It is a diplomatic post of the Holy See, whose representative is called the Apostolic Nuncio with the rank of an ambassador.

The title Apostolic Nuncio to Tajikistan is held by the prelate appointed Apostolic Nuncio to Kazakhstan; he resides in Kazakhstan.

== List of papal representatives to Tajikistan ==
Apostolic Nuncios

- Marian Oleś (28 December 1996 – 11 December 2001)
- Józef Wesołowski (16 February 2002 – 24 January 2008)
- Miguel Maury Buendía (12 July 2008 – 5 December 2015)
- Francis Assisi Chullikatt (30 April 2016 – 01 October 2022)
- George Panamthundil (15 July 2023 – present)
