= Vincent Paulos =

His Excellency Vincent Paulos
- Metropolitan of Marthandom
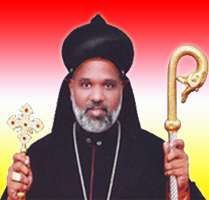
- Church: Syro-Malankara Catholic Church
- Archdiocese: Trivandrum
- Diocese: Marthandam
- See: Marthandam, Tamil Nadu
- Elected: 25 January 2010
- Appointed: 13 March 2010
- Installed: 13 March 2010
- Predecessor: Yoohanon Mar Chrysostom

Orders
- Ordination: 2 January 1991 by Benedict Mar Gregorios
- Consecration: 13 March 2010 by Baselios Cleemis

Personal details
- Born: Vincent Paulos; 20 February 1964 (age 62) Kumarankudy, Thiruvattar, Tamil Nadu
- Parents: Kochupillai and Maria Thangam

Vincent Mar Paulos (born 20 February 1964) is the Metropolitan Bishop of the Syro-Malankara Catholic Eparchy of Marthandom.

== Early life ==
He was born in Kumarankudy Village near Thiruvattar in the District of Kanyakumari in the state of Tamil Nadu. He belongs to the Eparchy of Marthandom. His parents are Kochupillai and Maria Thangam.

He was educated at St. Aloysius Seminary, Trivandrum.

== Ministry ==
He was ordained priest at his home parish Annakarai on 2 January 1991 by Benedict Mar Gregorios.

Catholic Church titles
Preceded by Yoohanon Mar Chrysostom	Bishop of the Syro-Malankara Eparchy of Marthandom; 2010–present	Succeeded by Incumbent
