= Apostolic Nunciature to Kyrgyzstan =

Diplomatic post of the Holy See

The Apostolic Nunciature to Kyrgyzstan is an ecclesiastical office of the Catholic Church in Kyrgyzstan. It is a diplomatic post of the Holy See, whose representative is called the Apostolic Nuncio with the rank of an ambassador.

The title Apostolic Nuncio to Kyrgyzstan is held by the prelate appointed Apostolic Nuncio to Kazakhstan; he resides in Kazakhstan.

== List of papal representatives to Kyrgyzstan ==
Apostolic Nuncios

- Marian Oleś (9 April 1994 – 11 December 2001)
- Józef Wesołowski (6 July 2002 – 24 January 2008)
- Miguel Maury Buendía (12 July 2008 – 5 December 2015)
- Francis Assisi Chullikatt (24 June 2016 – 1 October 2022)
- George Panamthundil (15 July 2023 – present)
