= Miguel Maury Buendía =

Spanish prelate of the Catholic Church (born 1955)

The Most Reverend Miguel Maury Buendía
- Apostolic Nuncio to Great Britain; Titular Archbishop of Italica
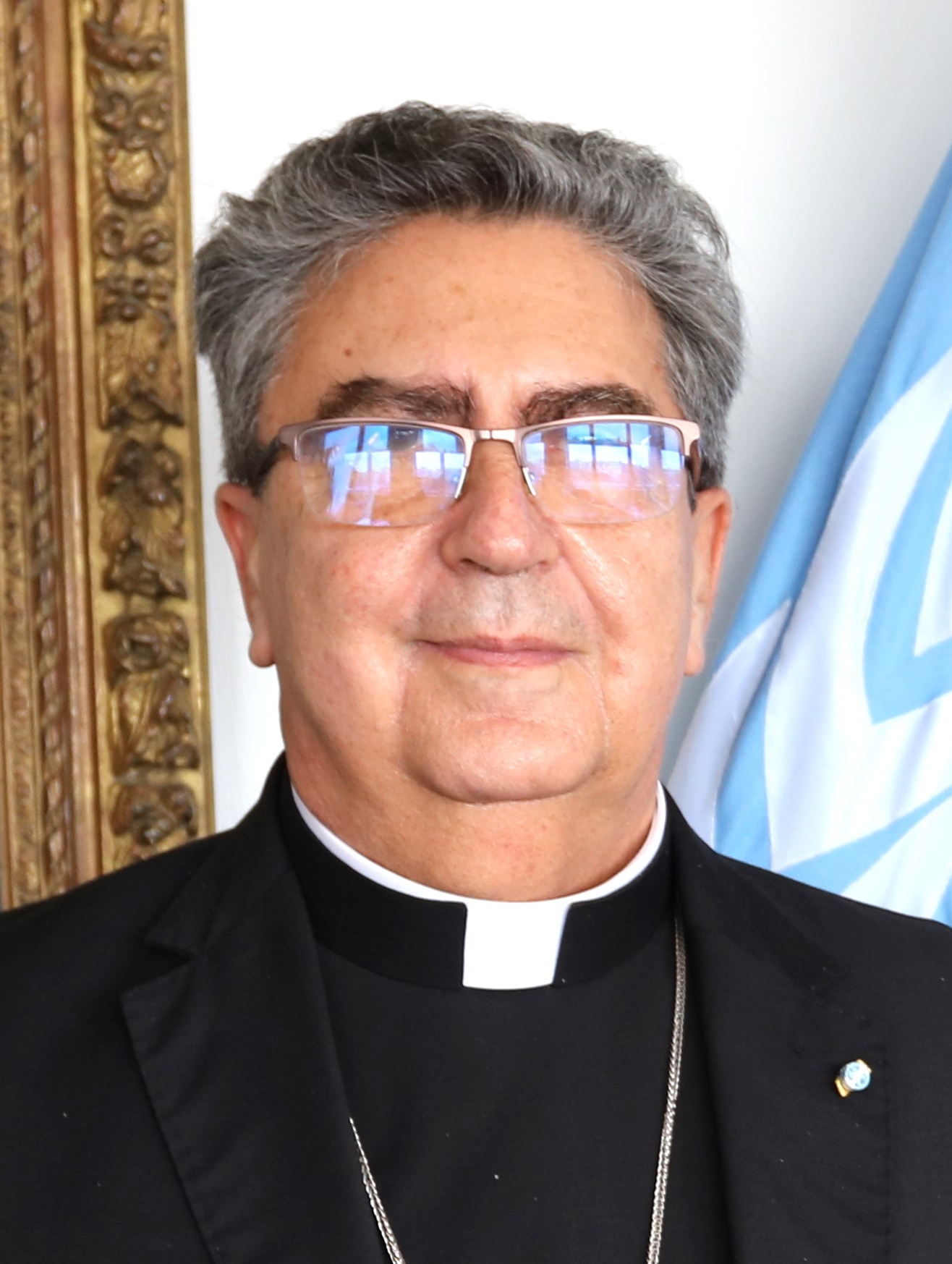
- Maury Buendía in 2024
- Church: Catholic
- Appointed: 13 April 2023
- Predecessor: Claudio Gugerotti
- Other post: Titular Archbishop of Italica (2008‍–‍ )
- Previous posts: Apostolic Nuncio to Kazakhstan, Kyrgyzstan and Tajikistan (2008‍–‍2015); Apostolic Nuncio to Romania and Moldova (2015‍–‍2023)

Orders
- Ordination: 26 June 1980 by Vicente Enrique y Tarancón
- Consecration: 12 June 2008 by Tarcisio Bertone, Antonio María Rouco Varela, and Pier Giacomo De Nicolò

Personal details
- Born: November 19, 1955 (age 70) Madrid, Spain
- Motto: Quis Ut Deus (Latin for 'Who Is Like God')
- Coat of arms
- Awards: Medal of the Order of Isabella the Catholic (Spain); Medal of the Equestrian Order of the Holy Sepulchre of Jerusalem; Medal of the Order of Mercy (Kazakhstan)

Styles of Miguel Maury Buendía
- Reference style: His Excellency; The Most Reverend
- Spoken style: Your Excellency
- Religious style: Archbishop

Miguel Maury Buendía (born 19 November 1955) is a Spanish prelate of the Catholic Church who has spent his career in the diplomatic service of the Holy See. An archbishop since 2008, he has been apostolic nuncio to several countries. On 13 April 2023, he was appointed as nuncio to Great Britain.

== Biography ==
Miguel Maury Buendía was born in Madrid on 19 November 1955 to a family with Andalusian roots. He completed primary studies at the Jesuits' San Estanislao Kotska School in Málaga, his baccalaureate at the Ramiro de Maeztu Institute in Madrid, some music courses at the Royal Conservatory of Music of Madrid and obtained a degree in Geography and History, speciality of History of Art, from the Faculty of Philosophy and Letters of the Autonomous University of Madrid. After studying philosophy and theology in the Conciliar Seminary of Madrid, he was ordained a priest of the Archdiocese of Madrid on 26 June 1980 by Vicente Enrique y Tarancón. On 1 July, he was appointed vicar of the parish of the Holy Trinity of Collado Villalba, where he remained until October 1984. During military service, he served as chaplain of the Military Hospital of Barcelona and the Army High School.

He obtained a degree in dogmatic theology at the Pontifical University of Salamanca in 1985 and a doctorate in canon law at the Pontifical University of St. Thomas Aquinas (Angelicum) in 1987.

== Diplomatic career ==
After the two-year program of diplomatic studies at the Pontifical Ecclesiastical Academy of Rome, he entered the diplomatic service of the Holy See on 13 July 1987 and served as secretary in the apostolic nunciatures of Rwanda, Uganda, Morocco and Nicaragua (1987-1996) and as Counselor to those of Egypt, Slovenia and Ireland (1996-2004).

In addition to his work in the diplomatic service, he was a professor at the National Seminary of Nicaragua and the Italian Lyceum of Cairo. He has also been auxiliary chaplain of the Carabinieri and of the residence of the Little Sisters of the Abandoned Elderly in Rome.

Since 1 September 2004, he has been responsible for Southeast Europe in the Section for Relations with States of the Secretariat of State of the Holy See. He has also represented the Holy See at various international conferences and congresses. He knows Italian, English, French, Slovene, and Russian.

On 19 May 2008, Pope Benedict XVI appointed him titular archbishop of Italica and apostolic nuncio to Kazakhstan. On 12 July he was made nuncio to Kyrgyzstan and Tajikistan as well. On 12 June, he received his episcopal consecration from Cardinal Tarcisio Bertone.

On 5 December 2015, Pope Francis named him apostolic nuncio to Romania, adding on 25 January 2016 the position of apostolic nuncio to Moldova. Maury Buendía has an audience with Francis in January 2019 in anticipation of the papal visit to Romania in May 2019.

On 13 April 2023, Pope Francis named him apostolic nuncio to Great Britain. He presented his Letters of Credence to King Charles III on 18 May

He has been awarded the Medal of the Order of Isabella the Catholic (Spain), Medal of the Equestrian Order of the Holy Sepulchre of Jerusalem, and Medal of the Order of Mercy (Kazakhstan).

== See also ==
- List of heads of the diplomatic missions of the Holy See
- Catholic Church in Moldova
- Catholic Church in Romania
