= Mylapra =

- village
- Location in Kerala, India Mylapra (India)
- Coordinates: 9°17′0″N 76°47′0″E
- Country: India
- State: Kerala
- District: Pathanamthitta

Population (2011)
  - Total: 10,082

Languages
  - Official: Malayalam, English
- Time zone: UTC+5:30 (IST)
- PIN: 689671,689678
- Telephone code: 0468
- Vehicle registration: KL-03

Mylapra is a small town in Pathanamthitta district in the Indian state of Kerala. It comes under the Mylapra Panchayath. The town is situated on the way to the famous Hindu pilgrim center, Sabarimala. The Main Eastern Highway (Punalur–Pathanamthitta–Muvattupuzha Road/SH-08) passes through Mylapra.

== Etymology ==
The word mylapra is derived from two Malayalam words myle (a peacock) and appuram (the other side). It is believed that a hunter used a sword to kill a peacock but the peacock escaped narrowly and fell on one side and the sword hit the other. This was the birth of the names of two places, viz Mylapra and Vettipuram. "Myle (peacock) appuram (that side), Vett (cut) ipuram (this side). The side where the peacock fell is named Mylapra; the side where the sword fell is Vettipuram."

== Demographics ==
As of 2011 India census, Mylapra had a population of 10082 with 4732 males and 5350 females.

== Religious places ==
=== Temples ===
- Mylapra Sree Durga Devi Temple
- Devi temple, Kumbazha North
- NSS Karayogam, Mylapra
- SNDP Kumbazha North Temple
- വമ്പൂക്കര ശിവക്ഷേത്രം
- മേക്കൊഴൂർ ഹ്യഷികേശക്ഷേത്രം
- SNDP മേക്കൊഴൂർ
- NSS മേക്കൊഴൂർ

=== Churches ===
- St. George Orthodox Church, Mylapra
- Sacred Heart Malankara Catholic Church, Mylapra
- Shalom Mar Thoma Syrian Church, Mylapra
- Jerusalem Marthoma Church, Valliyanthy
- Palamoodu Mar Kuriakose Orthodox Church, Kumbazha North
- Christian Brethren Church, Mylapra.
- St. Thomas Orthodox Chapel Mannapuzha.
- St. Mary's Catholic Church Marygiri, Kattadi.
- St. Thomas Malankara Catholic Church, Valliyanthy.
- Indian Pentecostal Church Valliyanthy.
- St. Marks CSI Church, Mylapra.
- Orthodox Chappal, Valliyanthy.
- Church of God(full Gospel) Mannarakulanji.

=== Ashram ===
- Bethany Ashram, Mylapra
- Mar Kuriakose Orthodox Dayara, Kumbazha North

== Education ==
=== Schools ===
- Mount Bethany English Higher Secondary School, Mylapra
- Sacred Heart Higher Secondary School, Mylapra (Kerala Board)
- N.M.L.P School, Mylapra (Kerala Board)
- Government L.P School, Mylapra (Kerala Board)
- M.S.C.L.P. School, Valliyanthy.
- SNV UP School, Kumpazhavadakku
- M.T.H.S High school Mekkozhoor
- S.N.D.P UP School Mekkoxhoor
- M.D.LP School Mekkozhoor

=== Teacher Training Institute ===
- Sacred Heart Teachers Training College, Mylapra

=== Industrial Training Institute ===
- Mar Philoxenos ITI, Mylapra
