= Syro-Malankara Catholic Eparchy of the United States of America and Canada =

Eastern Catholic ecclesiastical jurisdiction in North America

Eparchy of Saint Mary, Queen of Peace
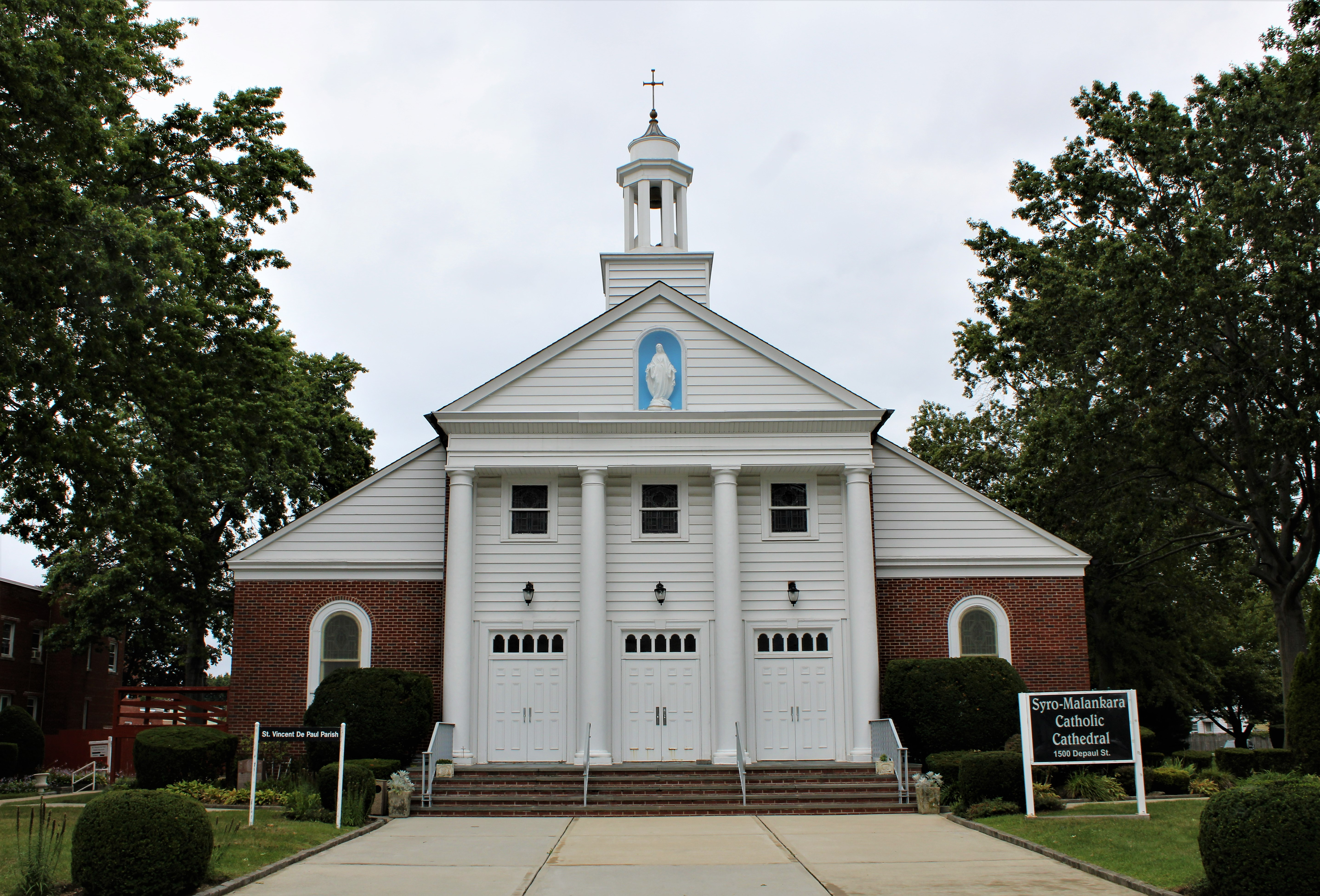
- St. Vincent de Paul Cathedral

Location
- Country: United States
- Ecclesiastical province: Immediately subject to the Major Archbishop of Trivandrum
- Coordinates: 40°42′35.86″N 73°41′47.62″W

Statistics
- Parishes: 27

Information
- Sui iuris church: Syro-Malankara Catholic Church
- Rite: Syro-Malankara Rite
- Cathedral: St. Vincent de Paul Malankara Syrian Catholic Cathedral, Elmont, New York
- Patron saint: Mary, Queen of Peace
- Secular priests: 15

Current leadership
- Bishop: Philippos Stephanos Thottathil
- Vicar General: Augustine Mangalath

Website
- https://mccna.org

The St. Mary, Queen of Peace Syro-Malankara Catholic Eparchy in USA and Canada is the Syro-Malankara Catholic Church eparchy of the Catholic Church for all of North America, and is home to 23 parishes and missions in different cities. The Syro-Malankara Church observes the Antiochian Rite in the Syriac language. It is immediately subject to the Major Archbishop of Trivandrum, and is not part of an ecclesiastical province. Its cathedral is the St. Vincent de Paul Syro Malankara Catholic Cathedral in Elmont, New York, United States.

== History ==
In 2001, the Holy Synod of the Syro-Malankara Catholic Church requested that Pope John Paul II establish a jurisdiction for Syro-Malankara parishes in the United States, which had each been functioning under the direction of the local Latin Church bishops, and requested the appointment of a proper Ordinary of the church sui iuris. On July 14, 2010, Pope Benedict XVI erected the Syro-Malankara Catholic Apostolic Exarchate in the United States, a missionary pre-diocesan apostolic exarchate. Thomas Eusebius, formerly secretary general of the Syro-Malankara Catholic Major Archeparchy of Trivandrum, became the first Exarch. In the sole incumbent was also vested the office of Apostolic Visitor in Canada of the Syro-Malankars.

== Council ==
- President: Philippos Stephanos
- Secretary: Philipose Mathew
- Syncellus: Peter Kochery, Corepiscopa
- Vicar General: Augustine Mangalath, Corepiscopa
- Leader of Media Relations: Mohan P. Varughese

== Episcopal ordinaries ==
(all of the Syro-Malankara Catholic Church)

=== Apostolic Exarchs of United States of America ===
- Thomas Eusebius (July 14, 2010 – January 4, 2016), Titular Bishop of Lares (Africa), Apostolic Visitor in Canada of the Syro-Malankars, Apostolic Visitor in Europe of the Syro-Malankarites (July 14, 2010 – present)

=== Eparchs of United States of America and Canada ===
- Thomas Eusebius (January 4, 2016 – September 23, 2017), remains Apostolic Visitor in Europe of the Syro-Malankarites
- Philippos Stephanos (October 28, 2017 – present)

== The Curia of the Eparchy ==
Designation	Name
Chief Vicar General	Augustine Mangalath
Chancellor and Procurator	Saji Mukkoot

=== Location ===
Eparchial Chancery (Aramana): 1500 De Paul Street Elmont, NY 11003

Designation	Name
Eparch	Most Rev. Dr. Philippos Stephanos Thottathil
Vicar	Very Rev. Noby Ayyaneth

== Parishes and missions ==
=== Parishes and Missions ===
- St. Ephrem’s Syro-Malankara Catholic Mission, Austin
- St. Jude’s Syro-Malankara Catholic Mission, Calgary
- St. Mary's Syro-Malankara Catholic Church, Chicago
- St. Mary's Syro-Malankara Catholic Church, Dallas
- St. Joseph's Syro-Malankara Catholic Church, Detroit
- St. Mary's Syro-Malankara Catholic Church, Edmonton
- St. Vincent De Paul Syro-Malankara Catholic Cathedral Parish, Elmont
- St. Peter's Syro-Malankara Catholic Church, Houston
- St. Thomas’s Syro-Malankara Catholic Church, London
- St. Mary’s Syro-Malankara Catholic Mission, South Florida
- St. Thomas’s Syro-Malankara Catholic Church, New Jersey
- St. Peter & St. Paul’s Syro-Malankara Catholic Mission, Niagara Falls
- St. Jude Syro-Malankara Catholic Church, Philadelphia
- St. Peter's Syro-Malankara Catholic Church, Rockland
- St. Jude’s Syro-Malankara Catholic Mission, San Jose
- St. Mary's Syro-Malankara Catholic Church, Toronto
- St. Joseph’s Syro-Malankara Catholic Mission, Vancouver
- St. Mary's Syro-Malankara Catholic Church, Washington D.C.
- St. Mary's Syro-Malankara Catholic Church, Yonkers
- St. George Syro-Malankara Catholic Mission, Atlanta
- St. Joseph's Syro-Malankara Catholic Mission, Boston
- St. Mary Syro-Malankara Catholic Mission, Los Angeles
- Syro-Malankara Catholic Mission, Phoenix
- Syro-Malankara Catholic Mission, Seattle
- Syro-Malankara Catholic Mission, Tampa
- St. George Syro Malankara Mission Kitchener

== See also ==
- List of Catholic dioceses (structured view)
- List of the Catholic dioceses of the United States
- List of the Catholic bishops of the United States
- St. Jude Syro Malankara Catholic Church
