= Syro-Malankara Catholic Eparchy of Marthandom =

Syro-Malankara Catholic eparchy in India

Eparchy of Marthandom Eparchia Marthandomensis

Location
- Country: India
- Territory: Tamil Nadu
- Ecclesiastical province: Major Archdiocese of Trivandrum
- Coordinates: 8.302754°N 77.219145°E

Statistics
- Area: 1,664 km^{2} (642 sq mi)
- Population: Total; Catholics: (as of 2009); 2,026,000; 75000 (3.2%)
- Parishes: 97

Information
- Denomination: Catholic Church
- Sui iuris church: Syro-Malankara Catholic Church
- Rite: Syro-Malankara Rite
- Established: 16 December 1996
- Cathedral: Christuraja Cathedral (Christ the King Cathedral)
- Patron saints: St. Paul and St. Therese of Lisieux
- Secular priests: 41

Current leadership
- Pope: Leo XIV
- Major Archbishop: Baselios Cleemis
- Bishop: Vincent Mar Paulos

Map
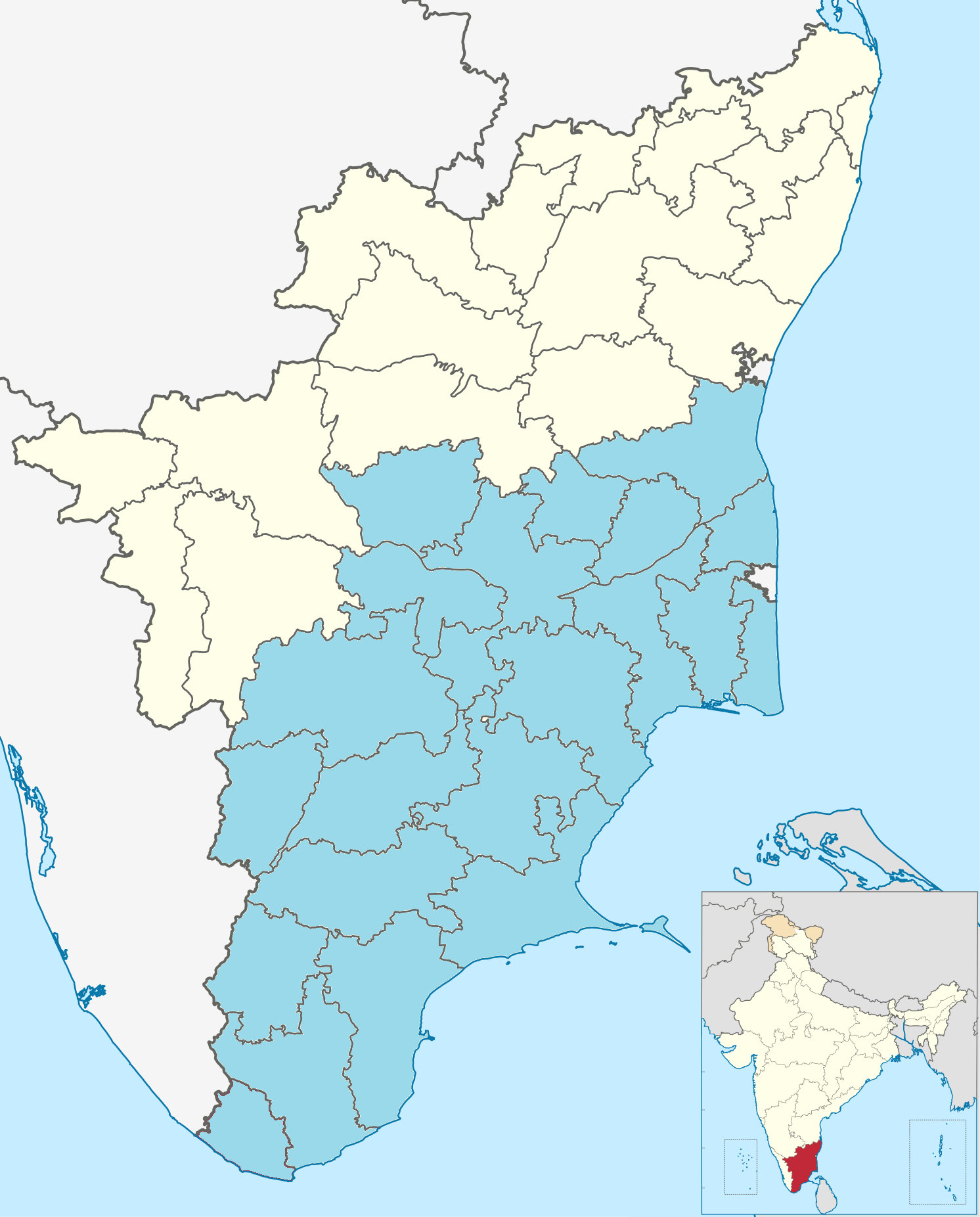

Website
- marthandamdiocese.com

The Eparchy of Marthandom (also called Marthandam) is a Syro-Malankara Catholic Church ecclesiastical territory or eparchy in Kanyakumari District, Tamil Nadu, India. It was created by Pope John Paul II on 16 December 1996. It was the fourth eparchy of the Syro-Malankara Catholic Church.

Its territory covers three civil districts: Kaliakkavilai, Marthandam, Nagercoil. The Syro-Malankara Catholic Church in Kanyakumari District is among the largest religious groups in the region. The Eparchy of Marthandam is a suffragan eparchy in the ecclesiastical province of the Archeparchy of Trivandrum.

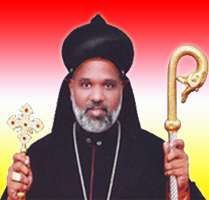
Bishop Vincent mar Paulos
