= Joshua Ignathios =

Catholic bishop (born 1950)

His Grace, The Most Reverend Joshua Mar Ignathios
- Emeritus Eparch of Mavelikara
- Church: Syro-Malankara Catholic Church
- See: Eparchy of Mavelikara
- In office: 2007–2025
- Predecessor: Seat created
- Successor: Matthews Polycarpos
- Previous post: Auxiliary Bishop of Trivandrum (1998–2007)

Orders
- Ordination: 2 April 1978 (Kashesho), 29 June 1998 (Bishop)

Personal details
- Born: 24 May 1950 (age 76) Kottarakara, Kollam District, Kerala

Styles of Joshua Mar Ignathios
- Reference style: His Grace; The Most Reverend
- Spoken style: Your Grace
- Religious style: Bishop

Joshua Mar Ignathios (born 24 May 1950) was the Eparch of the Eparchy of Mavelikara of the Syro-Malankara Catholic Church in the state of Kerala, India. He retired as Eparch on 30 May 2025.

== Family history and childhood ==
He was born at Kottarakara, Kollam district as the son of Oommen Varghese and Annamma Varghese. He had his primary education at the St. Mary's School, Kizhaketheruvu, and he completed his secondary education at the Government High School, Kottarakkara, in 1967.

== Training and ordination ==
He joined St. Aloysius Seminary, Trivandrum, in 1967, and completed his pre-degree at Mar Ivanios College, Trivandrum. He had his philosophy and theology training at St. Joseph's Seminary, Tiruchirappalli, Tamil Nadu, from 1970–78. He was ordained as a priest on 2 April 1978 by the Metropolitan Archbishop Benedict Mar Gregorios. He served in the parishes at Kirathoor, Manjathoppu, Vimalapuram, add Susaipuram from 1978 to 1983. He graduated from Christian College, Marthandom, Tamil Nadu, and secured his master's degree from Madurai Kamaraj University, Tamil Nadu, in 1984. He took Bachelor's and master's degrees in Education from Kamaraj University, Madurai in 1985 and 1987 respectively.

He did research on "Leadership, Organizational Health with School Effectiveness" in Stella Matituna College of Education, Chennai and obtained a Doctorate from the University of Madras in 2000. Br Publishing Corporation published his doctoral thesis, School Effectiveness Through Leadership Style & Organizational Health in 2003.

== Mission work ==
He was appointed vicar of the mission stations at Padi, Perampur, and Thiruvottiyoor in Chennai in 1983. He started the Mar Ivanios Dispensary and founded the Sacred Heart School, serving as its principal from its inception. In 1994, he established the Mar Gregorios College and served as its local manager until 1996.

== Appointed and elected offices ==
In May 1996 he was appointed Vicar General of the Archieparchy of Trivandrum. He was made Corepiscopo in 1997. On 15 April 1998 he was appointed the Auxiliary Bishop of the Archieparchy of Trivandrum by Pope John Paul II. Metropolitan Archbishop Cyril Mar Baselios ordained him bishop with the name Joshua Mar Ignathios on 29 June 1998.

Metropolitan Mar Ignathios was the Vice Chairman of the Labour Movement of the Kerala Catholic Bishop's Conference (KCBC) from 1998–2000. He served as its Chairman for 2002–2007. He was elected the Secretary of the KCBC and served the Church of Kerala in this capacity from 2000–2002. In December 2007 he was elected the Vice President of the KCBC. He has held the chairmanship of the Labour Commission of the Catholic Bishop's Conference of India (CBCI) since 2002.

Metropolitan Mar Ignathios became the President of the KCBC due to the demise of its previous president Archbishop Daniel Acharuparambil on 26 October 2009.

The Holy Episcopal Synod of the Syro-Malankara Catholic Church elected him the first Metropolitan of the newly erected Eparchy of Mavelikkara. The inauguration of the new Eparchy and the installation of Mar Ignathios as its Metropolitan took place on 16 February 2007. He served the Eparchy until retiring on 30 May 2025.

== Other activities ==
Metropolitan Mar Ignathios was an active member of the Nilackal Ecumenical Trust. Along with the Bishops of the Episcopal Churches, He made several ecumenical journeys and visited many international pilgrim centres. He also visited the World Council of Churches centre at Geneva and attended an international conference organized by that group, and has attended other international conferences organized by the CBCI and the Holy See.

== Sources ==
- Joshua Mar Ignathios

Catholic Church titles
Preceded by Geevarghese Divannasios	Auxiliary Bishop of the Major Archeparchy of Trivandrum; 1998–2007	Succeeded by Samuel Mar Irenios
Preceded by Position established	Bishop of the Syro-Malankara Eparchy of Mavelikara; 2007–2025	Succeeded by Mathews Mar Polycarpos
