= Samuel Mar Irenios =

Indian bishop

His Excellency Most Rev. Dr. Samuel Mar Irenios
- Bishop of the Syro-Malankara Catholic Eparchy of Pathanamthitta
- Church: Syro-Malankara Catholic Church
- Diocese: Syro-Malankara Catholic Eparchy of Pathanamthitta
- Appointed: 10 April 2018
- Installed: 7 June 2019
- Predecessor: Yoohanon Chrysostom
- Previous post: Auxiliary Bishop Syro-Malankara Catholic Major Archeparchy of Trivandrum

Orders
- Ordination: 22 December 1978 by Benedict Gregorios
- Consecration: 25 January 2010 by Baselios Cleemis

Personal details
- Born: 13 May 1952 (age 74) Kadammanitta,Kerala

His Excellency Most Rev. Dr. Samuel Mar Irenios (born 13 May 1952) is an Indian Syro-Malankara Catholic clergyman, educator, and prelate. He is currently bishop of the Eparchy of Pathanamthitta of the Syro-Malankara Catholic Church. He succeeded Yoohanon Chrysostom Kalloor on 7 June 2019 and became the second bishop of the eparchy, which was erected in 2010.

== Family and education ==
Mar Irenios was born 13 May 1952 in Kadammanitta in Pathanamthitta District, Kerala of his parents K. C. Thomas and Annamma Kattukallil. He received secondary education at Government High School, Kadamanitta, did a pre-degree course at Mar Ivanios College, Trivandrum, minor seminary at St. Aloysius, Trivandrum, and philosophy and theology at St. Joseph's Pontifical Seminary, Aluva (Alwaye).

He also holds BA, MA, and PhD degrees in Malayalam language and literature from the University of Kerala. The doctorate was awarded in 1995 for a dissertation on Malayalam poetry.

Mar Irenios also studied at the Tantur Ecumenical Institute in Jerusalem.

== Ministry and academic service ==
Mar Irenios was ordained to the priesthood 22 December 1978 for the archeparchy of Trivandrum by its Archbishop Benedict Varghese Gregorios Thangalathil and served in a number of parishes.

He was editor-in-chief of Christhava Kahalam, the official journal of the Trivandrum archeparchy, and the archeparchy's syncellus (episcopal vicar) (2007–10). He was Vice Rector of St. Aloysius Minor Seminary (1978-1985); Lecturer, Bursar (1985 to 1995), eventually Principal of Mar Ivanios College; and Principal of St John's College, Anchal (2000-2006).

He has served on many academic boards including the Board of Studies of the University of Kerala, the Academic Council of Sree Sankaracharya University of Sanskrit, Kalady, and the National Literacy Mission.

Mar Irenios has published extensively. His works include Karutha Chiriyude Kavi, on the poetry of Ayyappa Paniker, and Prakashathinte Utsavam, reflections on life broadcast on All India Radio in Trivandrum. He edited Dhanya Jeevitham and Visvasavum Vikasanavum, two anthologies on the life and vision of the archbishop who ordained him, Benedict Mar Gregorios. He is a regular broadcaster and contributor to print media.

== Episcopacy ==
On 25 January 2010 Mar Irenios was appointed auxiliary bishop of Trivandrum and titular bishop of Tamalluma. He was ordained bishop 13 March 2010 by Major Archbishop, Moran Mor Baselios Cleemis Catholicos. On 10 April 2018 Mar Irenios was appointed coadjutor bishop of Pathanamthitta and succeeded when Mar Chrysostom resigned on 7 June 2019.

== Controversies ==
Mar Irenios and his five priests were arrested on 6 February 2022 on charges of alleged illegal sand mining, but Church officials said they are being implicated in the case. Bishop Samuel Mar Irenios and five priests including a vicar general of Pathanamthitta Diocese in southern Kerala state were arrested by neighboring Tamil Nadu state's crime branch officials accusing them of illegally mining river sand. The case pertains to large-scale mining of river sand from a plot of land adjacent to a check dam on Thamirabarani river near Pottal in Tamil Nadu's Tirunelveli district. The 300-acre plot is owned by the Pathanamthitta diocese and was leased out to Manuel George for farming.

Catholic Church titles
Preceded by Joshua Mar Ignathios	Auxiliary Bishop of the Major Archeparchy of Trivandrum; 2010–2018	Succeeded by Mathews Mar Polycarpos
Preceded by Yoohanon Mar Chrysostom	Bishop of the Syro-Malankara Eparchy of Pathanamthitta; 2019–present	Succeeded by Incumbent
