= Philippos Stephanos Thottathil =

Indian bishop (born 9 May 1952)

His Excellency, The Most Reverend Philipos Mar Stephanos Thottathil
- Eparch of St. Mary, Queen of Peace
- Church: Syro-Malankara Catholic Church
- Diocese: Syro-Malankara Catholic Eparchy of the United States of America and Canada
- Appointed: 5 August 2017
- Installed: 28 October 2017
- Predecessor: Thomas Mar Eusebius
- Previous post: Auxiliary Eparch of Tiruvalla and Titular Bishop of Sozopolis in Haemimonto (2010-2017)

Orders
- Ordination: 27 April 1979 by Isaac Youhanon Koottaplakil
- Consecration: 13 March 2010 by Baselios Cleemis, Thomas Koorilos Chakkalapadickal, and Yoohanon Chrysostom Kalloor

Personal details
- Born: 9 May 1952 (age 74) Ranni, India
- Motto: Thy Kingdom Come

Styles of Philipos Mar Stephanos Thottathil
- Reference style: His Excellency; The Most Reverend
- Spoken style: His Excellency
- Religious style: Eparch

Philipos Mar Stephanos Thottathil (born 9 May 1952) is an Indian Bishop of the Syro-Malankara Catholic Church, in office since 2017. He is the second and current bishop of the Syro-Malankara Catholic Eparchy of the United States of America and Canada, having previously served as Auxiliary Eparch for the Syro-Malankara Catholic Archeparchy of Tiruvalla (2010-2017).

== Biography ==
On 27 April 1979, Stephanos Thottathil was ordained to the priesthood. Pope Francis appointed Stephanos Thottathil eparch for the Syro-Malankara Catholic Eparchy of the United States of America and Canada on 5 August 2017. On 28 October 2017, Stephanos Thottathil was installed as eparch.

== See also ==
- Catholic Church hierarchy
- Catholic Church in the United States
- Historical list of the Catholic bishops of the United States
- List of Catholic bishops of the United States
- Lists of patriarchs, archbishops, and bishops

Catholic Church titles
Preceded by Thomas Mar Eusebius	Eparch of St. Mary, Queen of Peace; 2017 – present	Succeeded by Incumbent
Preceded by -	Auxiliary Eparch of Tiruvalla; 2010-2017	Succeeded by -
