= St. Aloysius Minor Seminary, Trivandrum =

St. Aloysius Minor Seminary is the first minor seminary of the Syro-Malankara Catholic Church in Thiruvananthapuram, Kerala, India. It is situated at Kesavadasapuram,Thiruvananthapuram.

== History ==
The Minor Seminary was established by the founder of the reunion movement Servant of God Archbishop Mar Ivanios on 21 June 1934, on the feast of St. Aloysius Gonzaga. The seminary started working in a temporary building adjacent to the Little Flower Parish Church, Pattom. In 1938 the seminary was shifted to the Archbishop Mar Ivanios’ residence. The seminary remained at St. Mary's Cathedral Compound for a long time. It moved sites several times and in 2016 this seminary moved to Kesavadasapuram to its present building which was used as the clergy home for retired priests.

A Major Seminary was established by Benedict Mar Gregorios in 1983 and it moved to a permanent building at Nalanchira in 1989. The Major Seminary (known as St. Mary's Malankara Major Seminary) was granted affiliation to the Faculty of Theology of the Pontifical Urban University, Rome on 4 April 2005. The Major Seminary’s motto is ‘to continue Jesus’ mission of love and service.’. In 2019, the Major Seminary had 237 students.

== Curriculum ==
The Minor Seminary course lasts four years. Some students join after completing secondary school, while others enroll after higher secondary education. Those who have completed higher secondary education typically spend two years at the institute, while others spend four years. Students follow a structured routine that includes daily Mass, prayer, academics, and recreation. The curriculum includes higher secondary education along with subjects such as Bible study, Church history, catechism, liturgy, spirituality, etiquette, personality development, music, and languages, particularly Syriac, English, and Malayalam. Regular confession, spiritual direction, and spiritual conferences are part of the seminary routine. The program is designed to prepare students for entry into a major seminary.

After the successful completion of minor seminary formation, the students are sent to different major seminaries in India for philosophical studies for a period of three years. Subsequently, a whole year is dedicated for practical training called Regency period. After that, they are sent to St. Mary’s Malankara Major Seminary (the only major seminary for the entire Syro-Malankara Catholic Church) for their theological formation. This will last for four years. In short, the priestly formation in the Syro-Malankara Catholic Church extends for a period of 12 years.

== Alumni ==
Former students at the Minor Seminary include;

- Geevarghese Panicker Principal of Mar Ivanios College
- Joshua Mar Ignathios first bishop of Mavelikara
- Samuel Irenios Kattukallil Bishop of Pathanamthitta
- Benedict Mar Gregorios (Varughese/(Kunjukutty) Archbishop of Trivandrum, President of Catholic Bishops Conference of India (CBCI) and Kerala Catholic Bishops Conference (KCBC)
- Vincent Mar Paulos Bishop of Marthandom
- Samuel Mar Irenios Auxiliary Bishop of Trivandrum
- Yoohanon Mar Theodosius Bishop of Muvattupuzha and former rector of St Aloysius Minor Seminary,Thiruvananthapuram
