= European Fellowship =

Umbrella organization for Christian youth organizations in Europe

European Fellowship of Christian Youth
- Abbreviation: EF
- Formation: 1964; 62 years ago
- Type: INGO
- Purpose: International umbrella organization of Christian youth organizations
- Headquarters: Belfast, United Kingdom
- Members: 5 full member organizations
- Chair: Lilian Weeraratne
- Vice-Chair: Orsolya Czucza
- Vice-Chair: Mortan Sigaard
- Website: www.europeanfellowship.com

The European Fellowship of Christian Youth (EF) is an umbrella organization for Christian youth organizations from across Europe.

== Member organizations ==
=== Full members ===
Country	Name	Acronym
UK/Ireland	Boys' Brigade	BB
Romania	Erdélyi Ifjúsági Keresztyén Egyesület	IKE Transylvania
Denmark	Frivilligt Drenge- og Pige-Forbund	FDF
Finland	Lasten ja nuorten keskus	LNK
Iceland	Æskulýðssamband Þjóðkirkjunnar	ÆSKÞ

=== Associate members ===
Country	Name	Acronym
Ukraine	Compass Club Ukraine	Compass

=== Organizations in touch ===
Country	Name	Acronym	Additional information
Germany	Arbeitsgemeinschaft der Evangelischen Jugend in Deutschland e.V.	AEJ	
Croatia	CCCYO	CCCYO	
Spain	Coordinació Catalana	CCCCCE	Full member of Fimcap Europe
Belgium	Chirojeugd Vlaanderen	Chiro Flanders	Full member of Fimcap Europe
Estonia		EELK	
Latvia		ELCL	
Lithuania		ELCL	
Slovakia	eRko – Hnutie kresťanských spoločenstiev detí	eRko	Full member of Fimcap Europe
Italy	Forum Oratori Italiani	FOI	Full member of Fimcap Europe
Romania	IKE Transylvania	IKE Transylvania	
Switzerland	Jungwacht Blauring	JuBla	Full member of Fimcap Europe
Netherlands	Jong Nederland		Full member of Fimcap Europe
Hungary	KIE Hungary	KIE Hungary	
Germany	Katholische junge Gemeinde	KjG	Full member of Fimcap Europe
Austria	Katholische Jungschar	KJSÖ	Full member of Fimcap Europe
Croatia	MI Croatia	MI Croatia	
Malta	SB Malta	SB Malta	
Sweden	SKU Sweden	SKU Sweden	
Hungary	SZIE Hungary	SZIE Hungary	
Malta	Zghazagh Azzjoni Kattolika	ZAK Malta	Full member of Fimcap Europe
