= Kiro (disambiguation) =

Kiro was a colonial post in what is now Central Equatoria, South Sudan.

Kiro may also refer to:

== People ==
- Kirill, a Russian male given name with numerous alternative spellings, including Kiril or Kiro

=== Surname ===
- Bacho Kiro (1835–1876), Bulgarian revolutionary
  - Bacho Kiro cave
  - Bacho Kiro High School
  - Bacho Kiro Peak
- Cindy Kiro (born 1958), governor-general of New Zealand
- Kwon Hyi-ro, Kin Kirō in Japanese
- Lynn Kiro (born 1995), South African tennis coach

=== Given name ===
- Kiro Gligorov (1917–2012), president of Macedonia
- Kiro Honjo (1901–1990), Japanese aircraft designer
- Kiro Manoyan, Armenian politician
- Kiro Ristov (1953–1990), Yugoslav wrestler
- Kiro Stojanov (born 1959), Roman Catholic Bishop
- Kiro Urdin (born 1945), Macedonian film director

== Other uses ==
- Kiro, Kansas, unincorporated community in Shawnee County, Kansas
- Kiro Congo, a youth organization
- Mouvement Kiro d'Haiti, a youth organization
- Kiro Race Co, a motor racing team
- RFNS Kiro, ships of the Republic of Fiji Navy

== See also ==
- KIRO (disambiguation)
- Cairo (disambiguation)
- Kiros (disambiguation)
- Nina Kiro, an archaeological site
