= Xaveri Congo =

Catholic youth organization

- Type: Congolese non-profit youth organization
- Purpose: Catholic youth organization
- Headquarters: Democratic Republic of Congo
- Location: Democratic Republic of Congo
- Members: 42,000

Xaveri Congo is a Catholic youth organization in the Democratic Republic of Congo. Xaveri Congo is part of the African Xaveri Movement and a member of the Catholic umbrella of youth organizations Fimcap.

== History ==
Xaveri Congo was founded in 1952/53 in Congo. The foundation of Xaveri Congo was also the beginning of the African Xaveri Movement that spread also to different other African countries like Burundi (Xaveri Burundi), Rwanda (Xaveri Rwanda) and South Africa (Xaveri South Africa). Unlike the scouts Xaveri considers itself an apostolic movement.
