= Catholic youth work =

Activities carried out with young people

Young people at Castlerigg Manor

The phrase Catholic youth work covers a wide range of activities carried out with young people, usually in the name of the Catholic Church and with the intention of imparting the Catholic faith to them and inviting them to practice and live out the faith in their lives. Activities in the field range from small scale youth groups attached to parishes or Catholic schools, to large international gatherings, such as World Youth Day. It is a field which has evolved much over recent decades, especially in comparison to more formal methods of education or catechesis within the church. Nearly all dioceses and a great deal of parishes have some form of youth provision running, although a great deal of areas particularly in the developed world are finding youth work both more difficult and rare as the numbers of young people regularly practicing the Catholic faith continue to decline. In contrast, though, the new and exciting developments of recent decades and particularly the influence of the new movements within the Church are ensuring that youth work continues to be an active and fruitful field.

== Forms of organization ==
=== Catholic youth organizations ===
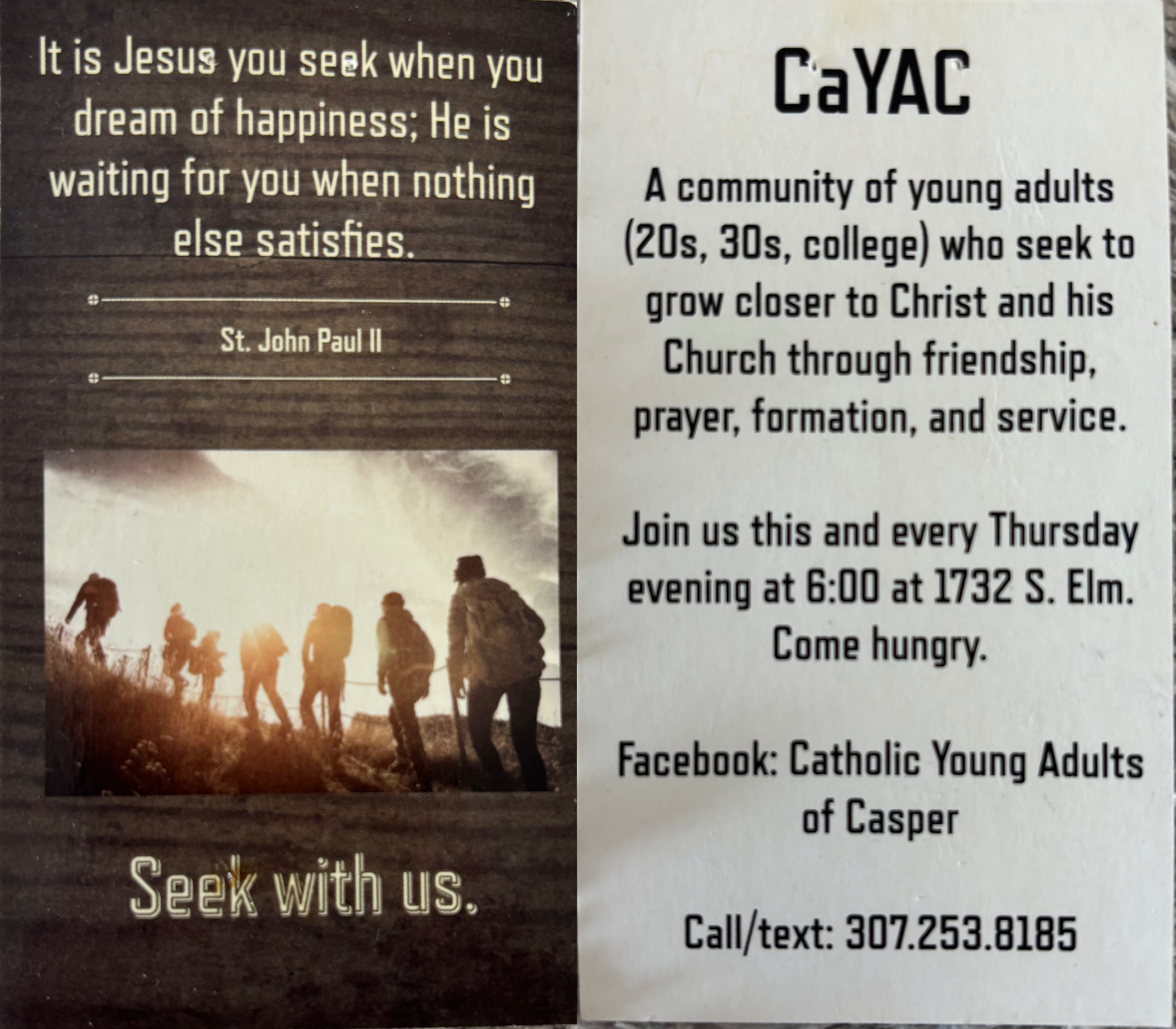
Cayac Young Adult Group at Saint Anthony’s Church in Casper, Wyoming Business Card (Front and Back)

In many countries local groups of Catholic youth have founded diocesan or national umbrella organizations to foster the exchange between young people and to organize joint activities, like camps, seminars or pilgrimages. Typical for the youth work of Catholic youth organizations is that their work is not determined by priests or other professionals but that they are self-organized and -determined by young volunteers. However, many Catholic youth organizations also elect a theologically qualified person as "preses". Many Catholic youth organizations in Europe are rooted in the movement of the Catholic Action.

=== Catholic youth work organized by youth workers, priests or orders ===
As with youth work in many Christian communities, Catholic youth ministry is often conducted by a combination of local priest pastors and lay volunteers. Some parishes, particularly in more affluent parts of the world, may well employee lay professionals on a full-time basis as well. In some areas of the Church, such as North America, there will be full-time youth officers at the deanery or diocese level. Some of the time these will be lay professionals and some of the time they will be priests or members of religious congregations. The advantages to employing priests in these roles include the reduced salary costs, their ability to minister the sacraments and their guaranteed theological knowledge. The shortage of priests in many areas, however, mean that dioceses are increasingly turning to religious or lay people, who as well as being a little more flexible, will also often be able to break down the barrier that is often perceived between priests and church congregations (e.g., the Salesians of Don Bosco).

=== School chaplaincy ===
This is particularly popular in the UK and Australia and other countries where Catholic Schools are common, but struggles to receive recognition in many areas where the role of full-time lay people within the Catholic Church is still not properly respected or provided for. Chaplaincy involves a dedicated youth worker acting as a lay chaplain to introduce an element of youth work provision into a school so as to back up the school's Catholic ethos and complement the mainstream educational work of the school. In recent and not-so recent times, many movements have emerged supporting or complementing chaplaincies, including Newman Centers in several countries, the Fellowship of Catholic University Students in the United States, and Catholic Christian Outreach in Canada.

=== Catholic residential youth work ===
Young people at a team building activity at Castlerigg Manor.

This involves the focused work done normally for just a few days where a course or retreat is run for a group of young people in a residential retreat center. Normally this work is very transitory work and residential centers can expect to work, in some cases, with thousands of young people a year. Young people are normally sent on retreat by a school or parish and thus the work is normally secondary rather than primary input. Catholic residential youth work is particularly popular in the UK, where an established network of thirteen centers exists, including places like Castlerigg Manor, SPEC Centre, Briars, Soli House, St Vincents Centre and Walsingham House.

=== New movements ===
Movements such as Youth 2000 and various organizations connected to the Charismatic Renewal will normally run either local groups not connected to parishes or schools, or larger annual events. Normally these groups will aim to enforce a certain part of faith in young people or a certain tradition or style. One of these new movements is LIFE TEEN, "leading teens closer to Christ"; a parish-based program centered on the Eucharist, Contemporary Christian Music, relational ministry and catechesis. Another movement is ECYD which focuses on youth service projects and personal prayer through a network of gender-specific clubs. Jesus Youth is a 28-year-old Catholic youth movement, which begin in India and now present many countries around the world. Some Catholic movements maintain a more secular appearance to advocate for Christian values like human dignity at the UN and other multilateral settings, as is the case of World Youth Alliance.

=== Mission teams ===
Mission teams are groups of youth workers who spend a period of time (usually around a week) in schools or parishes running a program, normally fairly kerygmatic in nature, with a group of young people. The transient nature of these programs makes this field somewhat similar to residential work, however the increased costs of maintaining mission teams combined with the difficulties in recruitment mean that they are normally not as widespread.

== Aims ==
=== Training and qualification ===
The issue of training and qualifications for Catholic youth workers is normally a sticky question in many parts of the world. The advantages and generosity of lay volunteers, for instance, is often augmented in the minds of some people by their lack of catechetical and theological knowledge in comparison especially to priests and also by their lack of training in informal education in comparison to secular youth workers. Many systems to educate and train youth workers have appeared and youth workers are able to participate in schemes for catechists (such as the CCRS in the UK). Also many youth workers in the Church are increasingly opting for secular training. On the whole though, the Church still lacks a formal and widely recognized system of training and achievement for youth workers, although a Foundation Degree in Youth Work/Youth Ministry (with professional JNC recognition) started in September 2007 at Newman University, Birmingham. This will be the first of many across the UK.

=== Empowerment and personal development ===
Empowerment has become an essential aspect of personal and youth development; this is in order to help curb the gaps created by our school systems across the globe so as to prepare young persons for the current demands of work and as well as the future of work which in itself is upon us with the ongoing COVID-19 pandemic. Youth underemployment poses a huge challenge to economic development if not looked at closely especially within the church.

== Different levels ==
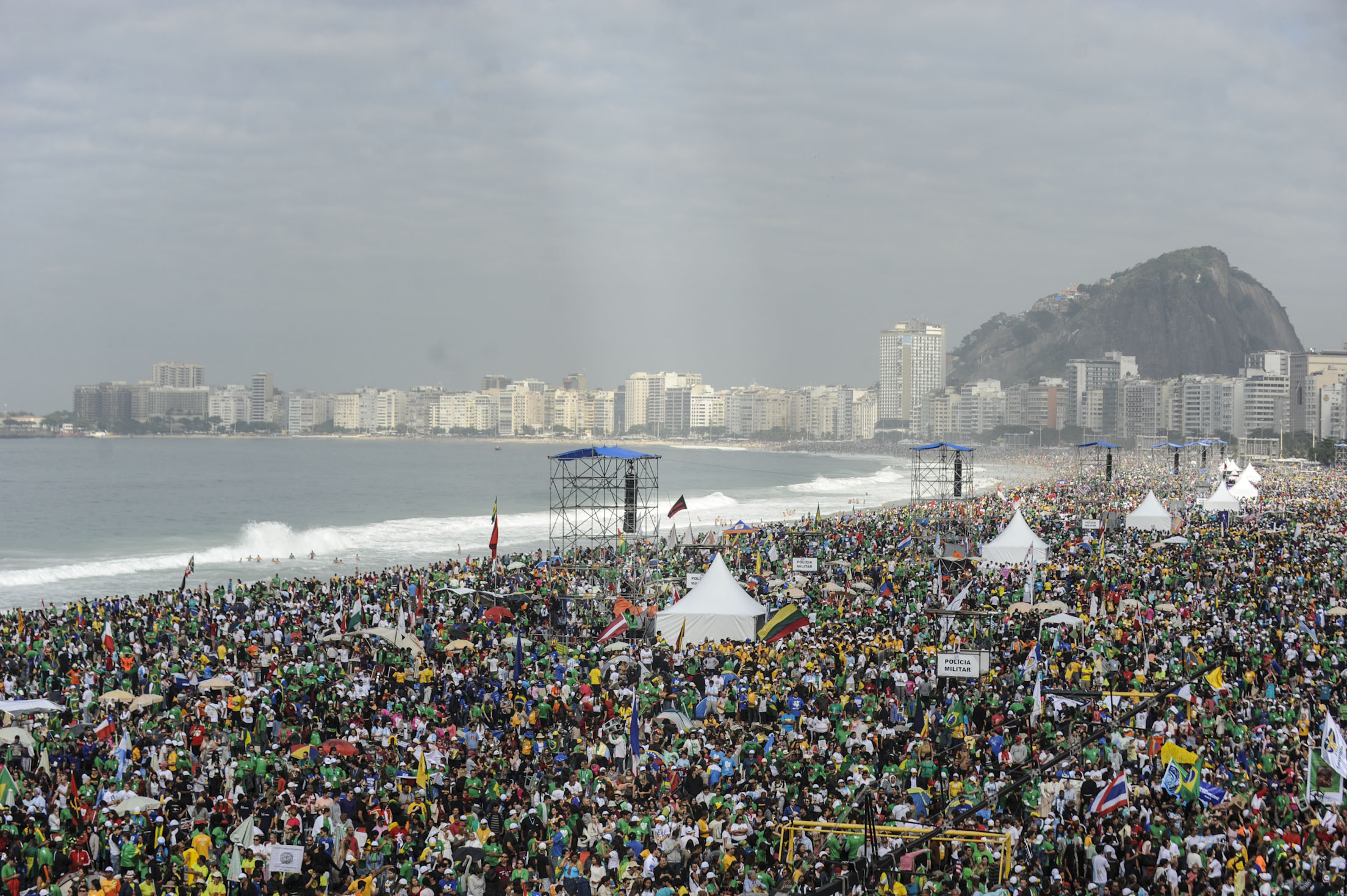
Youth Catholic crowds in Rio de Janeiro during the World Youth Day 2013.

There are a variety of different activities which are classed as Catholic youth work. They include the following:

=== Parish based youth work ===
A great deal of parishes have groups which cater to young people in some way or other. These may be designated 'youth groups' of 'youth clubs' or may be groups for particular young people within the parish such as altar servers or those about to receive confirmation, for example. Whether or not all groups for, or including, young people in parishes can be considered among the realm of youth work is debatable as many will be catechetical or organised around particular duties rather than holding to the established methodology of informal education. Both Catholic youth organizations and national and diocesan youth ministry departments often offer resources, ideas and programmes supporting parishes to plan and run own local youth ministry activities.

=== Area (diocesan/deanery) youth work ===
Many dioceses or deaneries will employ a coordinator to look after youth initiatives for a group of Churches. This is especially important in areas where not every parish can afford a full-time worker. Typically these coordinators, who may be a priest, a religious brother or sister will be responsible for training local volunteers and assisting them in setting up local youth groups, organizing large events or pilgrimages such as to World Youth Day, and building links between parishes and other local Catholic bodies such as schools.

=== International Catholic youth work ===
==== International Catholic youth organizations ====
There are also international networks and umbrella organizations of Catholic youth organizations (one of the biggest e.g. is the International Federation of Catholic Parochial Youth Movements).

==== World Youth Day ====
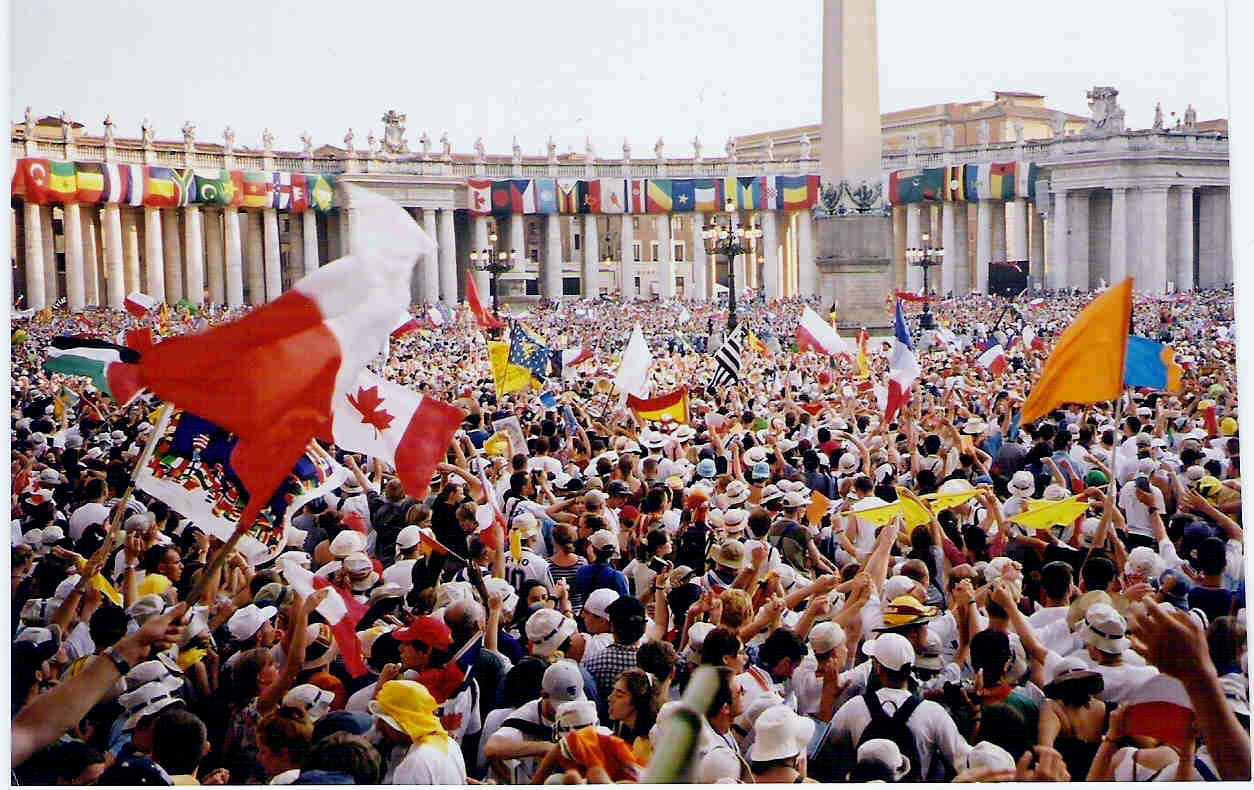
2.1 million people turned up to World Youth Day 2000 in Rome.

A global event held every 2–3 years and attended by the Pope. The event in the Philippines in 1995 was attended by over 5 million people, making it one of the largest Christian gathering ever. The last event was in Rio de Janeiro, Brasil in 2013; Kraków, Poland in 2016 was visited by Pope John Paul II.

=== Ecumenical cooperations ===
In some countries there is traditionally a good cooperation between youth organizations of different Christian denominations and churches. In Germany e.g. the Catholic youth umbrella BDKJ and the Protestant youth umbrella aej founded together the fairtrade initiative GEPA. There are also cooperations at international level. E.g. the International Federation of Catholic Parochial Youth Movements (Fimcap) has got a partnership with the European Fellowship.

== Recent challenges ==
In many countries, some of the doctrines of the Catholic church are perceived by public opinion as outdated or out of touch with reality. Often this perception is not only shared by the general public but also by Catholic laity and especially young people. A study by the University of Münster with participants from 42 countries around the world shows that in many would wish reforms of the Catholic doctrines, especially regarding the doctrines about sexuality.
