= Catholic Youth Organization Sierra Leone =

National Catholic Youth Organization Sierra Leone
- Abbreviation: CYO Sierra Leone
- Type: Sierra Leonean non-profit youth organization
- Purpose: Catholic youth organization
- Headquarters: Sierra Leone
- Location: Sierra Leone

The Catholic Youth Organization Sierra Leone (CYO Sierra Leone) is a Catholic youth organization in Sierra Leone. CYO Sierra Leone is a member of the Catholic umbrella of youth organizations Fimcap.

== History ==
During the Ebola crisis in Western Africa in 2014 CYO Sierra Leone joined the fight against the Ebola virus by supporting quarantine homes. This initiative was supported by the 0.7% donation of the German partner organization of CYO Sierra Leone "Katholische junge Gemeinde".
