= Niños Perseverantes Paraguayos Católico =

- Abbreviation: NIPPAC
- Type: Paraguayan non-profit youth organization
- Purpose: Catholic youth organization
- Headquarters: Paraguay
- Location: Paraguay

Niños Perseverantes Paraguayos Católico (NIPPAC) is a Catholic youth organization in Paraguay. NIPPAC is a member of the Catholic umbrella of youth organizations Fimcap.

== History ==
In 2012 NIPPAC hosted the Fimcap World Camp. During the camp the participants of the camp were involved in different social projects. The projects were supported by the 0.7% donation of NIPPAC's German partner organization Katholische Junge Gemeinde.
