= Catholic Youth Organization Ghana =

National Catholic Youth Organization Ghana
- Abbreviation: CYO Ghana
- Type: Ghanaian non-profit youth organization
- Purpose: Catholic youth organization
- Headquarters: Ghana
- Location: Ghana
- Members: 22,000 members

The Catholic Youth Organization Ghana (CYO Ghana) is a Catholic youth organization in Ghana. CYO Ghana is a member of the Catholic umbrella of youth organizations Fimcap.

== History ==
CYO Ghana was founded on 22 August 1948.

== Organization ==
CYO Ghana is structured in the following sections (based on age-groups):

Age group	Name of section
6 – 11 years	"infant jesus"
12 – 17 years	"young apostles"
18 years and older	"christian soldiers"
leaders	"officers"

== See also ==
- International Federation of Catholic Parochial Youth Movements (Fimcap)
- Catholic Youth Organization (CYO)
