= Chiro Philippines =

Philippine Catholic youth organisation

Chiro Youth Movement Philippines / Chiro Pilipinas
- Abbreviation: Chiro Philippines
- Type: Philippine non-profit youth organization
- Purpose: Catholic youth organization
- Headquarters: Quezon City, Philippines
- Location: Philippines
- Members: 1,500
- founder: Fr. Francis Gevers CICM
- Website: http://v4.chiro.ph/

Chiro Youth Movement Philippines (Filipino: Chiro Pilipinas) is a Philippine Catholic youth organisation. Chiro Philippines is a member of the umbrella of Catholic youth organizations Fimcap.

== History ==
In the 19th century the first structures of Catholic youth work developed in Europe and the Chiro movement emerged in Flanders. By Belgian missionaries the idea was brought also to the Philippines. Chiro was initiated in the Philippines on 10 January 1952 by Fr. Francis Gevers CICM.
