= Cyon =

Cyon may refer to:

- Cyon (wrestler) (Robert Anthony, born 1982), or Egotistico Fantastico, an American professional wrestler
- Elias von Cyon or Elie de Cyon (Ilya Fadeyevich Tsion, 1843–1912), Russian-French physiologist
- LG Cyon, a Korean cellphone brand
- "-cyon", a commonly used taxonomic affix
- Catholic Youth Organization Nigeria
