= Malankara Catholic Youth Movement =

Indian Catholic youth organization

- മലങ്കര കത്തോലിക്കാ യുവജന പ്രസ്ഥാനം
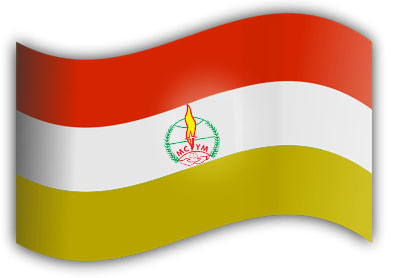
- Abbreviation: MCYM
- Formation: 28 February 1968; 58 years ago
- Type: Youth organization
- Headquarters: MCYM Office, Catholicate Centre, Pattom, Trivandrum, India
- Location: India, Worldwide
- Affiliations: Indian Catholic Youth Movement, Kerala Catholic Youth Movement
- Website: www.mcym.in

Chief Patron Moran Mor Baselios Cardinal Cleemis
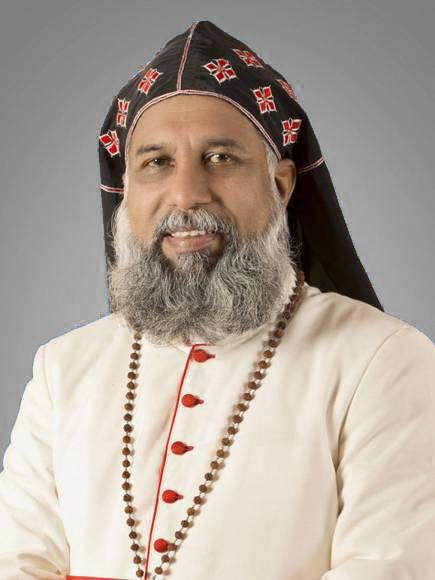

The Malankara Catholic Youth Movement (Malayalam: മലങ്കര കത്തോലിക്കാ യുവജന പ്രസ്ഥാനം), frequently referred to as MCYM, is an organization associated with the Syro-Malankara Catholic Church, aimed at fostering its youth members in the Catholic faith, as well as contributing to the broader community and church. The MCYM operates at various levels, including unit, regional, diocesan, and church-wide. Founded in Kerala, India, MCYM has spread on a global scale, spreading to areas such as the Middle East and North America. The chief patron is Moran Mor Baselios Cardinal Cleemis. The chairman is H.E Aboon Mathews Mar Polycarpos, the director is Rev. Fr. Prabheesh George Mekkarikathu, and the president is Monu Joseph.

== History ==
The Catholic Youth Movement of Kerala began in the latter half of the 1960s. Although some youth organizations existed at the parish level in various parts of Kerala, the establishment of diocesan-level organizations occurred later. Two primary factors contributed to the founding of these organizations during this period. Firstly, there was significant enthusiasm within the Church, both in Kerala and nationally, generated by discussions and study programs related to the Second Vatican Council. Among the topics discussed, the role of the laity in the Church's life became a major point of interest for laypeople across India. Secondly, in Kerala, Christian communities, alongside other social and religious organizations, opposed the educational policies of the second communist regime in 1967. This opposition provided an immediate cause for collaboration with the Church in advocating for justice.

The movement in the Thiruvananthapuram Diocese, led by Rev. Fr. Dominic Skariah, started in 1971 and later merged with the KCYO. Youth movements in Trivandrum, Thiruvalla, and Bathery operated independently but were eventually unified under the federal administrative structure of the Kerala Catholic Youth Movement (KCYM), which was a federation of youth movements from three independent churches. This unity was further solidified with the establishment of a youth commission under Cyril Baselios, then Bishop of the Bathery Diocese, in 1989, leading to the formation of the MCYM Central Secretariat in 1990.

The MCYM had distinct constitutions, flags, anthems, mottos, patron saints, and operational styles in various dioceses. To standardize these elements, the central secretariat established a common constitution, promulgated on 20 September 1992. The central secretariat also initiated steps to enhance youth activities, bringing together mission regions scattered across India, North America, Germany, and the Middle East (including Kuwait, Dubai, Sharjah and Qatar).

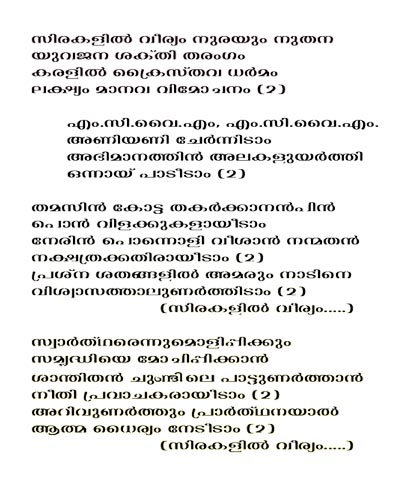
Official anthem of the MCYM; written in Malayalam

=== Commemoration of Venerable Mar Ivanios ===
On the day before the commemoration of the late Venerable Archbishop Geevarghese Ivanios, the founder of Malankara Reunion Movement, the MCYM conducts memorial meetings at the tomb of Ivanios.
