= CCRS =

CCRS may refer to:

- Catholic Certificate in Religious Studies, a certificate awarded by the Catholic Bishops' Conference of England and Wales
- Canada Centre for Remote Sensing, a branch of Natural Resources Canada's Earth Science Sector
- Commission of Railway Safety (Chief Commissioner of Railway Safety), the rail safety authority in India
