= Meggle =

Meggle may refer to:

- Meggle AG, a German dairy company
- Thomas Meggle (born 1975), German footballer and coach
