= JNM =

JNM can refer to:

- Jaynagar Majilpur railway station, a train station in South 24 Parganas district, West Bengal, India
- Jogja National Museum, a museum in Yogyakarta, Indonesia
- Jan Mayen Island, an unpopulated island in the Arctic Ocean, by NATO country code; see List of NATO country codes
- Jamia Naeemia Moradabad, an Islamic university in Moradabad, Uttar Pradesh, India
- Jeugdbond voor Natuur en Milieu, an organization that is part of the youth movement in Flanders, Belgium
- Jordanian National Movement, an organization in Jordan that was part of the Arab Nationalist Movement

== See also ==
- College of Medicine & JNM Hospital, a hospital and medical school in Kalyani, West Bengal, India
