= World Camp =

World Camp may refer to:

- World Camp (Guiding)
- Fimcap World Camp (Catholic youth)
