= Kerala Catholic Youth Movement =

Christian youth movement in India

- KCYM Official Logo
- Abbreviation: KCYM
- Formation: 1978
- Type: Youth organisation
- Headquarters: Ernakulam, Kerala, India
- Region served: Kerala
- Members: Age of 15–35
- Official language: മലയാളം
- President: Shibin Shaji Chenkulam
- Website: https://kcymstate.com/

The Kerala Catholic Youth Movement (KCYM) is an organization for the Catholic youth from three rites (Latin Church, Syro-Malabar Church and Syro-Malankara Church [Malankara Catholic Youth Movement]) of Christian community of Kerala in India. The patron saint of Kerala Catholic Youth Movement is St. Thomas More.

KCYM is the official state and regional organization under the auspices of the KCBC Kerala Catholic Bishops' Council. It is affiliated to the National Youth Body the "Indian Catholic Youth Movement" (ICYM). It consists of youngsters between the age group of 15–35 years who subscribe to Catholic values and principles, but beneficiaries include the youth of other religions. The main aim of KCYM is "The Integral Development of The Catholic Youth and The Total Liberation of Human Society in accordance with the Christian values". It is to coordinate and empower the human potentials of youth based on the Gospel values, to make them effective agents of change in the socio-religious-political-economic and cultural reality of India, especially of Kerala through National integration. It also aims at making the youth committed to the serving mission of the Church to the least, last and the lost.

KCYM is a federation of 32 diocesan youth movements of Kerala. Each affiliated diocesan movement has equal rights in the federation. Youth between the age of 15–35 are eligible for membership. Each diocese has its own structure in the Parish, Forane and Diocesan level.

Today, KCYM has a membership strength of 342,034 young people making it one of the influential organizations in the region.

== Office Bearers ==
Year	President	General Secretary
2026	Shibin Shaji	Casey P. Corneli
2025	Ebin Kanivayalil	Jobin Jose
2024	M.J. Emmanuel (Maniyapoziyil James Emmanuel)	Shalin Joseph Parakkudiyil
2023	Sharon K Reji	Joji Tennyson
2022	Shijo Mathew Edayadil	Bichu Kurian Thomas
2021	Edward Raju	Shijo Mathew Edayadil
2020	Bijo P. Babu	Christy Chackalackal
2019	Cyriac Chazhikadan	Bijo P. Babu
2018	Immanuel Michael	Ebin Kanivayalil
2017	Pradeep Mathew Nallila	Paul Jose Padamattummal
2016	Sijo Dominic	Vincent Mannithottam
2015	Shine Antony	Sijo Ambatt
2014	Renny Raj	Lorence PF
2013	Shijo Mathew	Renny Raj
2012	Sony Pavelil	Cyriac Chazhikadan
2011	—	—
2010	—	—
2009	—	—
2008	—	—
2007	—	—
2006	—	—
2005	—	—
2004	—	—
2003	—	—
2002	—	—
2001	—	—
2000	—	—
1999	—	—
1998	—	—
1997	—	—
1996	—	—
1995	—	—
1994	Vakkachan George	Regi Mathew
1993	—	—
1992	—	—
1991	—	—
1990	—	—
1989	—	—
1988	—	—
1987	—	—
1986	—	—
1985	—	—
1984	—	—
1983	—	—
1982	—	—
1981	—	—
1980	—	—
1979	—	—
1978	Adv. Antony M. Ambat	Adv. Joy Abraham

== Aim of KCYM ==
The Integral Development of the Catholic Youth and the Total Liberation of Human Society in accordance with the Christian values

== KCYM Anthem ==
The Integral Development of the Catholic Youth and the Total Liberation of Human Society in accordance with the Christian values

== KCYM Flag and Emblem ==
KCYM have a ‘common flag’ with tricolor 3 stripes red, white and yellow in order of top to bottom . White stripe is illustrated with the red emblem of K.C.Y.M in the center. The word ‘KCYM’ is printed in white stripe before the emblem. Red Area covered : 1/3rd of the flag Symbolization : Symbolizing the martyr ship of our savior Jesus Christ, saint and noble men. Inspiration to sacrifice our life for protecting truth, justices and faith. White Area covered : 1/3rd of the flag Symbolization : Nobility, Innocuous and purity Yellow Area covered : 1/3rd of the flag Symbolization : Faith and Christian suffering

== Patron saint ==
The patron of KCYM is St. Thomas More, who lived with the principle 'Rejoice in the Lord'. "The King's good servant, but God's first." More was beatified in 1886 and canonized by the Catholic Church as a saint by Pope Pius XI in 1935.

St. Thomas More, who lived with the principle "Rejoice in the lord", is the heavenly patron of KCYM. Later on Thomas More, who was popularly known as the patron of advocates, was also declared as the patron of politicians. Thomas More was born in Milk Street, London on February 7, 1478 as the son of Sir John More, a well-known judge. Thomas More completed his schooling in St. Anthony's School in London. As a youth he served as a page in the household of Archbishop Morton. More went on to study at Oxford under Thomas Linacre and William Grocyn. During his studies, he wrote comedies and learnt Greek and Latin literature. One of his first works was an English translation of a Latin biography of the Italian humanist Pico della Mirandola. In 1494 More returned to London to study law. He was admitted to Lincoln's Inn in 1496 and in 1501 he became a barrister. While at Lincoln's Inn, he determined to become a monk and subjected himself to the discipline of the Carthusians, living at a nearby monastery and taking part of the monastic life. The prayer, fasting, and penance habits stayed with him for the rest of his life. More's desire for monasticism was finally overcome by his sense of duty to serve his country in the field of politics. He entered Parliament in 1504.

One of More's first acts in Parliament had been to urge a decrease in a proposed appropriation for King Henry VII. In 1510, he was appointed one of the two undersheriffs of London. Serving in this position, he gained a reputation for being impartial, and a patron to the poor. In 1511, More's first wife died in childbirth. More was soon married again, to Dame Alice. In the following year, More attracted the attention of King Henry VIII. In 1515 he accompanied a delegation to Flanders to help clear disputes about the wool trade. Utopia opens with a reference to this very delegation. More was also instrumental in quelling a 1517 London uprising against foreigners, portrayed in the play Sir Thomas More, possibly by Shakespeare. More accompanied the King and court to the Field of the Cloth of Gold. In 1518 he became a member of the Privy Council, and was knighted in 1521.

More helped Henry VIII in writing his Defence of the Seven Sacraments, a repudiation of Luther, and wrote an answer to Luther's reply under a pseudonym. More had garnered Henry's favor, and was made Speaker of the House of Commons in 1523 and Chancellor of the Duchy of Lancaster in 1525.

In the year 1527, More refused to endorse King Henry VIII's plan to divorce Katherine of Aragón. Nevertheless, after the fall of Thomas Wolsey in 1529, More became Lord Chancellor, the first layman yet to hold the post. In the year 1531, the King discarded himself from the Pope's rule and declared himself the supreme authority of Catholic Church in England. In 1532, More resigned following his disapproval of Henry's stance toward the church. He refused to attend the coronation of Anne Boleyn in June 1533, a matter which did not escape the King's notice. In 1534 More was one of the person accused of complicity with Elizabeth Barton, the nun of Kent who opposed Henry's break with Rome. In April, 1534, More refused to swear to the Act of Succession and the Oath of Supremacy, and was committed to the Tower of London on April 17.

More was found guilty of treason and was beheaded alongside Bishop Fisher on July 6, 1535. More's final words on the scaffold were: "The King's good servant, but God's First." More was beatified in 1886 and canonized by the Catholic Church as a saint by Pope Pius XI in 1935.

== Directors ==
- 2025 – Rev. Fr. Ditto Coola
- 2019 – 2024 Rev. Fr. Stephen Thomas Chalakkara
- 2013–2018 – Rev. Fr. Mathew Jacob Thiruvalil OIC
- 2012–2012 – Rev. Fr. Jaison Kollanoor
- 2010–2010 – Rev. Fr. Sebastian Puthen
- 1978 – Fr. Thomas More CMI

== Activities 2015–2016 ==
- Sep 2015: Haritha Yuva Sangamam, Rashrta Sevak Campaign
- Oct 2015: 23 Koithu – Nurturing the Pokkali Fields, Oct 24 Yuvajagaran One Day Hunger Strike against Medical Termination of Pregnancy (MTP) Act
- Nov 2015: 13, 14, 15 Laudato Si Nature Camp, Kakkayam
- Dec 2015: 11, 12, 13 Utsav 2015 – Kerala State Catholic Youth Festival at Thalassery
- Jan 2016: KCYM State Senate at Thrissur

== Dioceses ==
- Alappuzha
- Bathery
- Changanacherry
- Ernakulam-Angamaly
- Idukki
- Irinjalakkuda
- Kanjirappally
- Kannur
- Kochi
- Kothamangalam
- Quilon
- Kottappuram
- Kottayam
- Kozhikode
- Mananthavady
- Mavelikkara
- Muvattupuzha
- Neyyattinkara
- Palai
- Palaghat
- Pathanamthitta
- Punalur

{{col-break archdiocesisof tellicherry

- Thamarassery
- Thiruvalla
- Thrissur
- Trivandrum Latin
- Trivandrum Malankara
- Verapoly
- Vijayapuram
- Parassala
