= FDF Outdoor Center Sletten =

Outdoor recreation center in Denmark

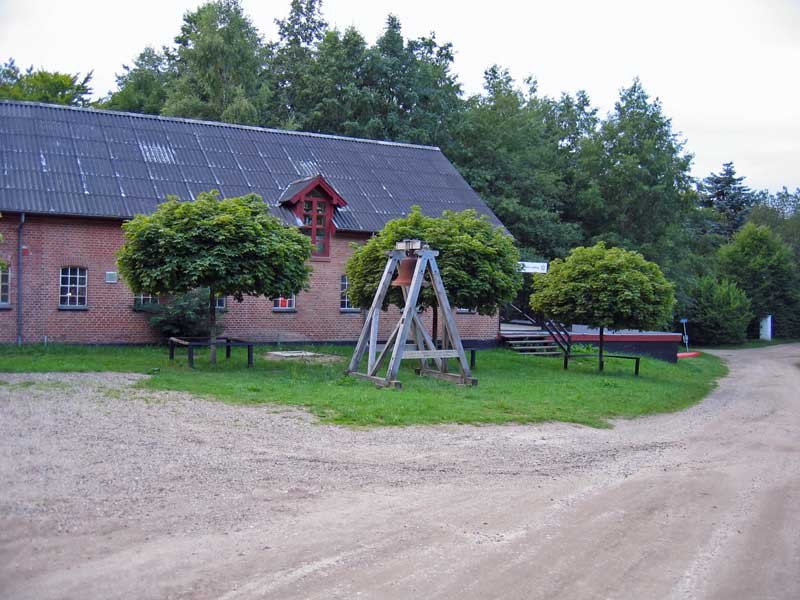
Æblegården

The FDF Outdoor Center Sletten (Danish: "FDF Friluftscenter Sletten", short: "Sletten") (English: "The Plains") is an outdoor center with a large camping area in Denmark. It belongs to the Danish youth organization FDF (Volunteer Boys and Girls Union).

== Activities ==
The outdoor center is used for various recreational and educational activities. Each Easter and Autumn, FDF hosts annual training courses for young FDF leaders (aged 15–18 years) as well as the FDF National Camp every five years. The area is also regularly rented by schools and other youth organisations, particularly Scouting organisations.

== Facilities ==
The area encompasses 225 acres of varied landscape.

The facilities of the center include:

- Course center "Det ny Sletten" (English: "The new Sletten")
- Camp building "Limbjerggård"
- Base camp "Bøgebjerg" with hay barracks
- Sailing center and nature workshop "Æblegården" (English: "Apple Garden"), including an exhibition with the historical collection of FDF
- Old barn with farm environment and workshop houses
- Shelters and many camping areas

== See also ==
- Frivilligt Drenge- og Pige-Forbund (FDF)
- Fimcap
- FDF National Camp
