= Xaveri Rwanda =

- Type: Rwandan non-profit youth organization
- Purpose: Catholic youth organization
- Headquarters: RWA
- Location: RWA
- Members: 28,000

Xaveri Rwanda is a Catholic youth organization in the Rwanda. Xaveri Rwanda is part of the African Xaveri Movement and a member of the Catholic umbrella of youth organizations Fimcap.

== History ==
On 31 October 1990 Xaveri signed together 16 other youth movements and the Episcopal Pastoral Commission in Rwanda a joint statement condemned the aggression of armed gangs of the NRA and the Ugandan regular Army and especially also the forced enlistment of children for these violent activities.

In 2015 Xaveri Rwanda hosted the Fimcap World Camp. The camp thematized Children's Rights as well as the recent dark chapter in the history of Rwanda, the Genocide in Rwanda.
