= Meggle Group =

German milk and whey processing company

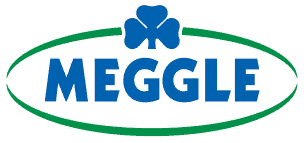
- Industry: Dairy
- Founded: 1887
- Founder: Josef Anton Meggle
- Headquarters: Wasserburg am Inn, Germany
- Key people: Matthias Oettel, Henning Dehler, Marcus Hormuth
- Revenue: 1037 million (2021)
- Number of employees: 2467 (2021)
- Website: meggle-group.com

Meggle is a German milk and whey processing company based in Wasserburg am Inn.

== History ==
In 1882 Josef Anton Meggle founded a dairy in Wasserburg am Inn. In order to expand, Josef's brother Jakob opened a sales office in Dresden in 1886 – but he speculated and the company went bankrupt. In March 1887, Josef Meggle started all over again and founded the company again. In the following decades the company continued to grow and in the 1930s became the largest dairy in Munich. In 1932, semi-automatic production began with machines forming 250 g and 500 g butter pieces. The breakthrough for Meggle came with the 37th International Eucharistic Congress in Munich in the summer of 1960. Meggle was chosen to supply the 500,000 international participants with butter during the week-long event. Meggle developed the portion butter – and created a new product category. In 1998, the company was restructured and became a stock corporation. In 2012 the companies revenue exceeded one billion Euros for the first time. 2020, they restructered the company again. Now, the Meggle Group GmbH is the Holding company for all Meggle subsidiaries. Meggle has production and sales locations in North and South America and Asia. In Eastern Europe, milk, cheese, cream and yoghurt products for local markets are produced at several locations.

== Products ==
Meggle produces butter and butter specialities such as herb, garlic and truffle butter. In 1995, cooled baguettes with herb butter were added to the product range.

In its Meggle Business Unit Excipients, Meggle develops and sells lactose-containing starting materials for the pharmaceutical industry. Meggle Business Unit Excpients is one of the leading market players in the global pharmaceutical lactose market.

== Slogan and logo ==
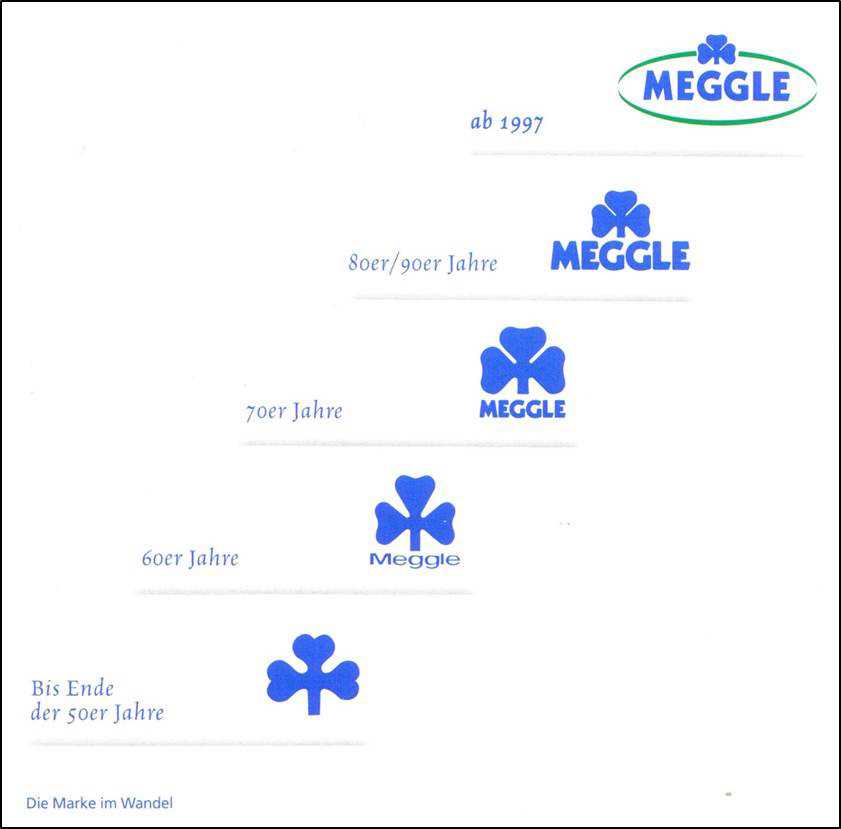
Meggle logos

Since the 1990s, Meggle's slogan is "Ich bin ein Gourmeggle" – a portmanteau of the words "Gourmet" and "Meggle". The company introduced a cloverleaf-logo in the 1930s, which was reworked several times over the decades.
