= Xaveri Burundi =

Catholic youth organization in Burundi

- Type: Burundi non-profit youth organization
- Purpose: Catholic youth organization
- Headquarters: Burundi
- Location: Burundi
- Members: 26,000

Xaveri Burundi is a Catholic youth organization in Burundi. Xaveri Burundi is part of the African Xaveri Movement and a member of the Catholic youth umbrella organization Fimcap.

== History ==
Xaveri Burundi was founded in 1953 by Reverend Frère Geolf.
