= Juventud Parroquial Chilena =

- Abbreviation: JUPACH
- Formation: 1965/1966
- Type: Chilean non-profit youth organization
- Purpose: Catholic youth organization
- Headquarters: Chile
- Location: Chile
- Members: 3,500

Juventud Parroquial Chilena (Spanish: [xuβenˈtuð paroˈkjal tʃiˈlena]; JUPACH) is a Catholic youth organization in Chile. JUPACH is a member of the Catholic umbrella of youth organizations Fimcap.

== History ==
In 1965 Fr. Andrés Materne and Marleen Buekens came from Belgium to Chile and helped to build up structures for Catholic youth work in Chile and initiated a youth movement. In 1966 the youth movement was called for the first time JUPACH (short for Juventud Parroquial Chilena). The first groups were founded in Talcahuano and Los Angeles. In 1968 the new youth movement organized its first camps for young people. In 1973 der "Consejo Nacional" (English: "National Council") of JUPACH was founded in Concepción, which administrates the youth organization at national level. In 1974 "Manual de JUPACH", a booklet for the leaders of the organization with the most important information about the organization, was released. In 1975 JUPACH was adopted as a full member of Fimcap.
