= Frivilligt Drenge- og Pige-Forbund =

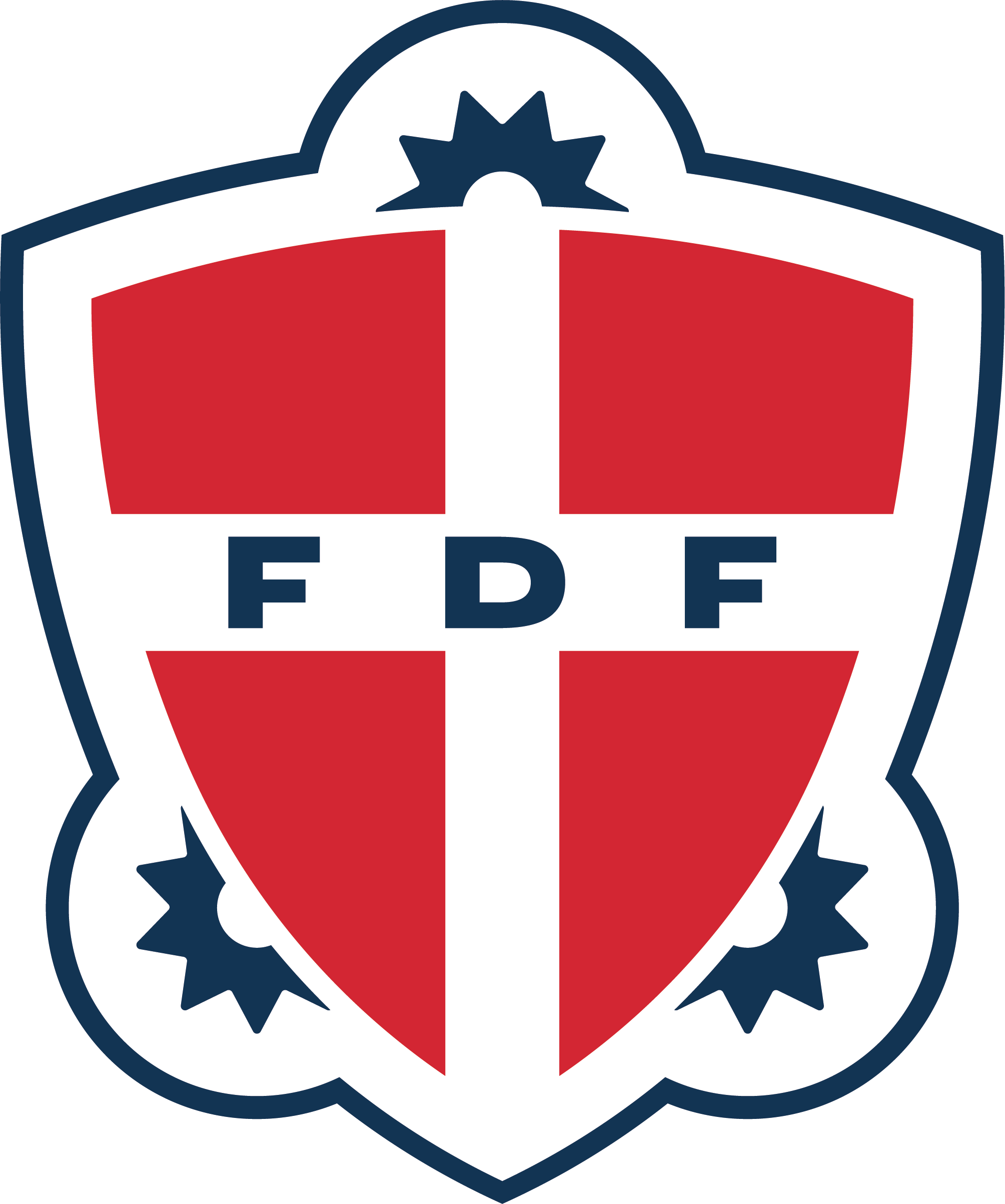
- Abbreviation: FDF
- Formation: October 27, 1902; 124 years ago
- Type: Danish non-profit youth organization
- Purpose: Christian youth organization
- Headquarters: Copenhagen, Denmark
- Location: Denmark
- Members: 17,500 members (2024)
- Website: www.fdf.dk/
- Formerly called: Frivilligt Drengeforbund; Frivilligt Pigeforbund

Frivilligt Drenge- og Pigeforbund (English: Voluntary Boy and Girl Association, FDF) is a Danish Christian youth organisation with approximately 17,500 members as of 2024.

FDF's activities are in many ways similar to scouting organisations. However, there are some differences, including the fact that in FDF children are always led by adults, and that FDF is not a member of any international scouting associations. Instead, FDF is a member of Fimcap, European Fellowship and Global Fellowship.

== History ==
The Frivilligt Drengeforbund (English: Voluntary Boy Association) was established by Holger Tornøe, a young architect and Sunday school teacher from Copenhagen, and Ludvig Valentiner. This organisation was founded on 27 October 1902 in Frederiksberg, and is Denmark's oldest uniformed youth association. Only boys could become members of Tornøe and Valentiner's Association. In 1952, the Frivilligt Pigeforbund (English: Voluntary Girl Association, FPF) was established with a similar structure and concept but which was instead for girls. In 1974 the two merged to form a joint youth organization open to both girls and boys. After the merger this association was called the FDF/FPF. In 1994, the name was simplified to FDF.

== Activities and structure ==
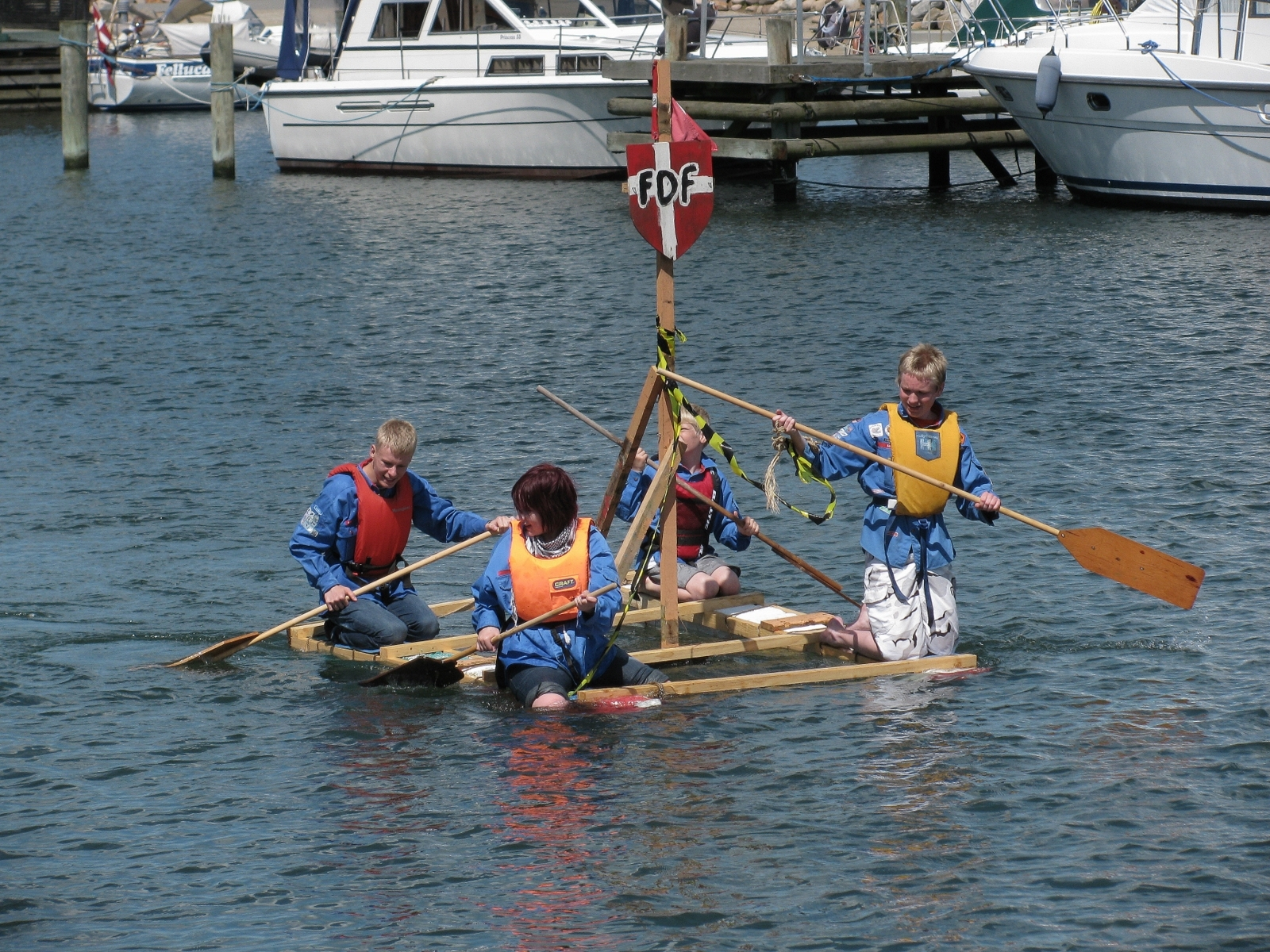
FDF group.

Since 1926, the FDF has hosted its National Camp event every five years at FDF Outdoor Center Sletten. The camp lasts 10 days and all members from the age of nine can take part. In 2011, the event attracted about 13,000 participants and more than 500 international guests from FDF's partner organizations took part.

FDF groups are divided by age divisions which are led by adult group leaders. The age divisions consist of the following groups:

- Puslling: 5 years–0th grade
- Tumling: 1st–2nd grade
- Pilt: 3rd–4th grade
- Væbner: 5th–6th grade
- Seniorvæbner: 7th–8th grade
- Senior: 9th grade–18 years old

== See also ==
- FDF Outdoor Center Sletten
- Fimcap
- FDF National Camp
