= CYO Camp Rancho Framasa =

Summer camp in Indiana

Coordinates: 39.2288°N 86.1969°W

CYO Camp is a residential summer camp located in Brown County, Indiana. It is operated by the Catholic Youth Organization and offers 8 one-week sessions for children during the summer.

== History ==
The original 280 acres (1.1 km^{2}) of land where Camp Rancho Framasa is located was donated by Bert Dingley in 1946. Dingley was the first champion of the organization that would later become Indy Car Racing. Dingley donated the land to the Archdiocese of Indianapolis to be used as a summer camp for the youth of the Church. His one stipulation was that the camp be named Rancho Framasa. He created the word Framasa by combining the first two letters of his daughters names. (FRAncis, MArgaret, and SAmuela.) All three are still living and attended the camp's 60th anniversary celebration at the Indianapolis Colts Complex in 2006. Portions of the camp also were a part of the original army installation Camp Atterbury. The old dining hall, now known as the Adventure Outpost, is a remnant of these days. It was built to be able to house the tanks which were tested in the surrounding hills.

The camp is capable of serving 250 children each week of the summer. Activities include horseback riding, rock wall climbing, swimming, canoeing, campouts, handicrafts, drama, and archery among others. The camp also hosts groups during the rest of the year.

The camp has also been the site of an archaeological dig and the exhumed materials are now on display at an Indiana University Museum.

== Notable alumni ==
Kenneth "Babyface" Edmonds was working at Rancho Framasa as the archery counselor when he received his break. Proof of this is seen through an interview he had on The Arsenio Hall Show in the early 1990s when he talked about his experiences working at the camp.

== Sources ==
- Parks and Recreation Magazine
- http://www.ncpad.org/get/discover/about.html
- Peyback Foundation
- Catholic Explorer.com
- National Arc Boggs/Mitchell Award
- https://www.ourbrowncounty.com/0102s5.htm
- Indiana Military.org
