= KIRO =

KIRO may refer to:

- KIRO (AM), a radio station (710 AM) licensed to Seattle, Washington, United States
- KIRO-TV, a television station (channel 23, virtual 7) licensed to Seattle, Washington, United States
- KIRO-FM, a radio station (97.3 FM) licensed to Tacoma, Washington, United States
- KKWF, a radio station (100.7 FM) licensed to Seattle, Washington, United States, which used the call sign KIRO-FM from September 1992 to May 1999

== See also ==
- Kiro (disambiguation)
