= Fimcap Eurocamp =

Catholic youth camp

The Fimcap EuroCamp is an international social activity organized by the International Federation of Catholic Parochial Youth Movements (Fimcap). The EuroCamp is organized once a year and is each time hosted by another European member organization of Fimcap. The World Camp combines group leader education and thematic work with intercultural exchange.

== History ==
List of former Fimcap EuroCamps Until 2008 the Fimcap EuroCamp was called EuroContact.

Year	Country	Topic
1998	Malta	
2001	Malta	
2003	Malta	
2005	Netherlands	
2006	Italy	
2007	Lithuania	
2008	Austria	
2009	Slovakia	Veni, Vidi, Web
2010	Malta	AMASS
2011	Catalonia	The power of you(th)
2012	Switzerland	Integration great creation
2013	Malta	
2015	Belgium	Youth against bullying
2016	Germany	United in diversity
2017	Austria	Open the Dialogue
2019	Malta	No Space for Poverty?!
2023	Romania	Green Revolution
2024	Belgium	
