= Hatsal Youth Ministry Institute =

Catholic organization in South Korea

- Abbreviation: Hatsal
- Type: South Korean institute for youth ministry
- Purpose: Catholic institute for youth ministry
- Headquarters: South Korea
- Location: South Korea
- Director: Fr. Pius Cho Cho Jae Yeoun.

Hatsal Youth Ministry Institute (Korean: 햇살청소년사목센터) is a Catholic organization in South Korea providing formation for people working in youth ministry as well as research on topics related to youth ministry and a network for the Catholic youth ministries in South Korea. Hatsal is a member of the umbrella of Catholic youth organizations Fimcap.
