= Generation Climate Europe =

European climate action youth coalition

Generation Climate Europe (GCE) is a coalition of major European youth organizations aiming to advocate for more climate action from European institutions.

== History ==
Generation Climate Europe was launched in September 2019 by youth activists like Nathan Méténier. The founding members of GCE are FIMCAP Europe, ESU, YEE, CliMates and AEGEE. In the meantime, a series of other major youth organizations have joined the coalition.

== Core demands ==
Generation Climate Europe was founded to unite the voices and efforts of Europe's major IYNGOs to advocate together toward the European institutions for more climate action. The coalition has formulated the following core demands:

- The European Union shall declare a climate emergency. Climate action needs to be mainstreamed in the policies of the EU. All decisions shall be evaluated on their climate impact.
- Young people shall be included in decision-making processes like the process of drafting the European Green Deal.
- The EU shall enhance its Nationally Determined Contribution (NDC) before 2020 to align with a maximum 1.5 °C increase. The EU should also immediately adopt a long-term climate strategy for carbon neutrality, at the latest at the next European Council in October 2019. (Dates are now in the past)
- Fossil fuel subsidies and new fossil fuel projects shall be terminated immediately. The EU needs a fast and comprehensive transition to clean renewable energy only.
- The costs incurred by the transition to a more sustainable society and economy in the short-term must be distributed in a socially equitable manner. Those who can afford the most need to commit the most.
- GCE demands that more investment and focus is put into providing Europe wide sustainable transport networks. The current infrastructure shall be modernised in order to keep up with the demand for sustainable travel and to lower transport costs. Night trains should be reintroduced and a tax on kerosene should be implemented.
- More emphasis shall be placed on education as a means to empower the youth and give them the tools to achieving a carbon-neutral and circular economy.

== Member organizations ==
Name	Acronym	Status
International Federation of Catholic Parochial Youth Movements	FIMCAP	Founding member
European Students' Union	ESU	Founding member
Association des Etats Généraux des Etudiants de l'Europe	AEGEE	Founding member
International Young Naturefriends	IYNF	Member
Organising Bureau of European School Student Unions	OBESSU	Member
Erasmus Student Network	ESN	Member
Young European Federalists	JEF Europe	Member
