= Le Patro =

Catholic youth organization

Le Patro (short: "Patro", earlier known as "le Patronage") is a youth organization which is present in Belgium, France and Canada.

== Patro in Belgium ==
Patro, which is recognized by the French Community of Belgium, has about 20,000 members aged from 4 to 35 years who are distributed in local groups in the French-speaking part of Belgium.

The equivalent of Patro in the Dutch-speaking part of Belgium is the Chirojeugd Vlaanderen, which has more than 100,000 members.

The members of Patro meet each weekend for joint activities. The groups are led by volunteer facilitators. The members of Patro are called "les patronnés".

== Bibliography ==
Walter Baeten, « Le cardinal Mercier et les patronages en Belgique (1906-1926) », dans Le patronage, ghetto ou vivier ? Actes du colloque des 11 et 12 mars 1987, s. dir. Gérard Cholvy, Paris, Nouvelle cité, 1988, p. 107-119.

Éric Lepage, « La Fédération nationale des patronages », dans Le patronage, ghetto ou vivier ? Actes du colloque des 11 et 12 mars 1987, s. dir. Gérard Cholvy, Paris, 1988, p. 121-143.

Éric Lepage et Françoise Rosart, « ‘Ici on joue et on prie’. La Fédération nationale des patronages, 1921-1940 », dans Entre jeux et enjeux. Mouvements de jeunesse catholiques en Belgique, 1910–1940, s. dir. Françoise Rosart et Thierry Scaillet, Louvain-la-Neuve, Arca - Academia Bruylant, 2002, p. 51-81.
