= FDF National Camp =

The FDF National Camp (Danish: "FDF Landslejr"), formerly also called Julsølejr, is a nationwide youth camp organized by the Danish Christian youth organization FDF every five years at the FDF Outdoor Center Sletten near Julsø. With more than 10,000 participants, it is one of the biggest children and youth camps in Denmark.

== Activities ==
The camps are designed to give children and young people the opportunity to increase experience in nature, with music and a new kind of celebrating divine services.

== History ==
Since 1926, FDF has hosted a big national camp ("FDF National Camp", "Camp Julsoe") every five years. The national camp takes place in Sletten. The camp lasts 10 days and all members over the age of nine can take part. In 2011 there were 13,000 participants. More than 500 international guests from FDF's partner organizations took part, as well.

1967	7,500	
1972		
1976	11,000	
1981	12,000	
1986	13,000	
1991	14,000	Queen Margrethe II of Denmark visited the camp for the first time.
1996	13,000	Queen Margrethe II of Denmark visited the camp.
2001	12,000	Queen Margrethe II of Denmark visited the camp.
2006	13,000	
2011	15,000	
2016	12,000	Queen Margrethe II of Denmark visits the camp on 7 July 2016. One of the many volunteers helping during the camp was Kristian Jensen, Danish Minister of Foreign Affairs.

== See also ==
- Frivilligt Drenge- og Pige-Forbund (FDF)
- Fimcap
- FDF Outdoor Center Sletten
