= Asociația Grupurilor Locale de Tineret =

Romanian youth organisation

- Abbreviation: AGLT
- Type: Romanian non-profit youth organization
- Purpose: youth organization
- Headquarters: Romania
- Members: 800 members

Asociația Grupurilor Locale de Tineret (acronym: AGLT; Romanian for "Association of Local Youth Groups") is a Romanian youth organisation. At international level AGLT is an associate member of the Catholic umbrella of youth organizations Fimcap.

== History and objectives ==
AGLT was founded in 2000 as result of a Flemish-Romanian project aiming to foster the emergence of youth work structures in Romania. Four years later AGLT was officially recognized as a non-profit NGO under the conditions of Ordinance no. 26/2000 regarding associations and foundations. It considers itself to be an association without patrimonial, governmental, political or religious purpose.

The organization has defined the following objectives for itself:

- empowerment of young people by socio-cultural action
- promoting human values and skills
- promoting creativity
- creating a framework for the development of young people through training and information
- providing opportunities to young people to express themselves

In the meanwhile, AGLT encompasses more than 40 local groups spread across Romania, focussing especially also on villages and small towns in the more rural areas of the country.

Since 2013, AGLT cooperates with the Thomas More University in Belgium. Students of the university can make their internships in Romania. Over the last years more than 10 Belgian students used this opportunity to make their internship in social studies in Romania.

In 2020 AGLT co-organized the project "Un alt fel de brăduț" (Romanian for "Another kind of Christmas tree") that took place between November 15 and December 15 in cooperation with the Romanian Ministry of Youth and Sports. The aim of the project, which is addressed to young people aged 14 or older, is to encourage young people to develop their creativity through the use of digital tools and to make the general public aware of the negative effects of the COVID-19 pandemic.

== Activities ==
AGLT supports local groups as an umbrella organization and for pedagogical advice. Their activities include especially:

- group meetings at local level ("play days")
- nationwide meetings bringing together young people from different villages and towns of Romania
- Trainings and seminars about group leader skills and personal development, non-formal education activities
- exchange projects and cultural actions
- Magazine "Drum in lucru": Magazine with information about activities and camps and news from local youth groups

AGLT developed also a special service for “children with special needs” ("handicaps"), called SPEAS.
