= Fimcap =

International organization

Fédération Internationale des Mouvements Catholiques d'Action Paroissiale
- Abbreviation: FIMCAP
- Formation: April 22, 1962; 64 years ago
- Type: INGO
- Purpose: International umbrella organization of catholic youth organizations
- Headquarters: Antwerp, Belgium
- Members: 33 unions
- Presidents: Tamara Vasquez González; Alain Ishimwe
- Praeses: Fr. Thierry
- Secretary-General: Annelies Van Wolvelaer
- Website: www.fimcap.org

The FIMCAP (Fédération Internationale des Mouvements Catholiques d'Action Paroissiale; French: International Federation of Catholic Parochial Youth Movements), is an umbrella organization for Catholic youth organizations. Its 34 member organizations are based in 29 countries. The FIMCAP was founded in 1962 and is recognised as an official Catholic organization by the Dicastery for Laity, Family and Life. FIMCAP is also a full member of the European Youth Forum.

== History ==
Already in 1959, French, Belgian and Dutch youth organizations had been working on the project of an international pooling, adopting a joint proposal in Lucerne in October 1959 during the National Presidents' Conference of European Movements affiliated to the International Catholic Youth Federation (ICYF). In 1960, the first delegate conference was held in Munich in the course of the 1960 Eucharistic Congress. On 7–8 October 1961 eleven youth associations officially founded FIMCAP in Munich. The foundation was proclaimed in public on Easter 1962. Since its recognition through the Holy See in 1976, the FIMCAP is an "International Catholic Organization" (ICO) and registered at the Council of Laity in Rome. Since 2006 the FIMCAP is being recognised as an International nongovernmental organization by the Belgian government.

A previous organization had been set up in 1921 in Rome under the name of "International Secretariat of Catholic Youth". The International Secretariat of Catholic Youth was reorganized on 15 September 1948 and renamed to "International Office of Catholic Youth – Bureau international de la jeunesse catholique" and another time reorganized in October 1954 and renamed to "International Federation of Catholic Youth (ICYF)". On 25 April 1968 merged with the "World Federation of Catholic Young Women and Girls" (WFCYWG) to form the "World Federation of Catholic Youth" (WFCY). WFCY ceased to exist in June 1981. Its activities were taken over by FIMCAP, making FIMCAP the biggest international umbrella organization of Catholic youth organizations.

== Activities ==
- Every three years, FIMCAP organizes the World Camp which is an international youth camp. (see: FIMCAP World Camp)
- FIMCAP has its own magazine called LINK Magazine. It is published four times a year.
- Spiritual activities
- Common visits on the World Youth Day
- FIMCAP day on 20 November

Activities in Europe

- EuroCamp: EuroCamp is a yearly European exchange activity for young leaders. (see: FIMCAP Eurocamp).
- EuroCourse: EuroCourse is a European training course for experienced leaders which focusses on a different theme each year.
- EuroTraining: EuroTraining is a yearly European training course that prepares trainers for international exchanges and activities.
- Roundabouts: Roundabouts are exchanges between local groups from different member organisations of FIMCAP Europe.
- Speeddating seminars: The speeddating seminars are a platform for groups to meet groups from other countries to start exchanges.
- Visits of international groups to activities of member organizations (e.g. to the national camps of FDF Denmark (see: FDF National Camp), Chirojeugd Vlaanderen and Katholische Jungschar Austria or the Ranfttreffen of Jungwacht Blauring Switzerland)
- Thematic projects
- Online campaigns
  - e.g. the online campaign "Vote Youthfully" informing about the 2019 European Parliament election.

== Thematic work and positions ==
FIMCAP and its members have defined for themselves the goal that they want to work together politically to identify and advocate the interests of children, adolescents and young adults within church, society and politics. FIMCAP argues that this is necessarily a part of their work, as FIMCAP is an international association of youth organizations for children, adolescents and young adults throughout the world and that as young people, youth organizations and youth work are confronted with different challenges. FIMCAP argues that this involvement is motivated by the Christian beliefs and shared values. FIMCAP argues that in this way it wants to guarantee and improve the quality of the youth work of their member organizations and FIMCAP, and to participate in shaping the future world and society, preserve our planet for future generations, and improve the prospects in general for future generations. FIMCAP sees sustainable and responsible planning and acting, fair social and economic chances, quality education, peace, charity, and solidarity as elementary requirements to achieve this. Pursuing this purpose, in recent years FIMCAP has defined in particular the following positions:

- Youth mobility: FIMCAP declares that it aims to advocate for improving the mobility of young people and anyone who is involved in youth exchange and activities. In particular FIMCAP together with the European Youth Forum calls for changes to make the EU visa code and directive more relevant for youth exchanges and international youth work. Additionally, in 2016 FIMCAP joined a joint call of major European youth organizations to preserve the Schengen principles.
- Recognition of (international and religious) youth work
- Sustainable funding of (international) youth work
- Environmental protection, efforts against climate change, and climate justice: FIMCAP emphasizes the responsibility to take care of all creation. FIMCAP calls for strong efforts at the individual and societal levels to stop climate change with its negative consequences. FIMCAP also would raise awareness about the problems already caused by the climate change and calls for solidarity with those affected the most by it. (See also: Laudato si'.) At its 23rd General Assembly FIMCAP decided to focus for three years on sustainability and countering climate change.
- Development and intercontinental cooperation: For FIMCAP, cooperation between the different continents on an equal basis is a core principle. At its 22nd General Assembly FIMCAP decided to focus for three years on advocating for the implementation of the Millennium Development Goals. Similarly, its 25th General Assembly decided to focus for three years on advocating for the implementation of the Sustainable Development Goals. The topic of the General Assembly was "Transforming our World: A child-rights-based approach to the sustainable development goals SDG".
- Empowerment of women and gender equality: FIMCAP emphasizes the importance of women's empowerment, gender equality and dignity, in facilitating social change. It wants to foster a practical, not only formal legal, equality of women and men.
- Children's Rights: FIMCAP advocates for participation and inclusion of all children in church and society and aims to empower the child to know its rights, as defined by the UN Convention of the Rights of the Child (CRC). FIMCAP declares that it wants to create free and safe places for children to play, explore, discover and thereby strengthen their values, and to find answers to their needs, fight against physical and psychological violence against children, and abolish child labour worldwide.
- Peace and interreligious dialogue: FIMCAP cooperates with Religions for Peace and the European Interfaith Youth Network. Together with other European faith-based youth organisations FIMCAP helped to define the needs and benefits in the field of inter-religious dialogue.

FIMCAP Europe

- Diversity, peace and respect: In early 2015 FIMCAP Europe adopted a common statement for diversity, peace and respect. The statement is presented as a reaction to recent incidents in Europe and other parts in the world like the increase of extremist and far right-wing movements, attacks against refugees and against people with a particular religion or origin and violence of self-appointed "religious" fighters.
- Young refugees: In October 2015 FIMCAP Europe adopted a common statement about "Helping together the children and young people who were forced to flee from war, persecution and hunger".
- Climate justice and just transition: FIMCAP Europe is a co-founding member of the alliance Generation Climate Europe. Within the alliance FIMCAP has initiated a working group on climate justice. The working group, led by FIMCAP volunteers, conducted comprehensive consultations to collect the ideas, proposals and demands of young people on how a transition to a green and sustainable Europe that is fast, comprehensive and socially just at the same time can be made possible. The results were published in the "Young Voices on Climate Justice Report".
- European Youth Goals: Taking in the 6th cycle of the EU Youth Dialogue FIMCAP contributed to the development of the European Youth Goals. FIMCAP was also selected to participate at the EU Youth Conferences where the European Youth Goals were adopted as part of the delegation of international youth NGOs.

== Structure ==
=== Statutory bodies ===
The highest committee of the FIMCAP is its General Assembly which comes together every three years. Every member organization sends a delegation to the General Assembly.

The administration and management of the FIMCAP is being handled by the intercontinental presidium which consists of two presidents, a Praeses and a Secretary-General. The presidents should be one man and one woman, but if there are no candidates of one gender the jobs might also be given to two women or two men.

The intercontinental bureau (ICB) is composed of the Presidium and representatives of the Continental Conferences. It acts as the FIMCAP Board of Directors.

Beneath these globally working establishments, the FIMCAP is also structured into continental conferences, bureaus and presidiums.

=== Eligibility and application for membership ===
All Catholic youth organizations can apply for membership in FIMCAP. The General Assembly of FIMCAP needs to confirm the membership of an applying member organization in a vote. Non-Catholic youth organizations can obtain the status of associate membership in FIMCAP.

At the General Assembly in Switzerland in 2016 FIMCAP further clarified the criteria of eligibility for membership and updated the membership categories. To become a Full Member of FIMCAP an organization needs to fulfill four criteria:

- being a Catholic organization
- organizes activities for children and / or youth
- being youth-led
- having a direct connection to the local level (typically the parish level)

Organizations fulfilling three out of the four criteria can apply for becoming an Affiliate Member of FIMCAP. Organizations only fulfilling two out of the four criteria can apply for becoming a Sustaining Member of FIMCAP. Full Members have full voting rights, Affiliate Members limited voting rights.

== Continental branches and member organizations ==
An organization whose name is written in bold is a founding member.

=== FIMCAP Europe ===
==== Presidium of FIMCAP Europe ====
The presidium of FIMCAP Europe is elected by the delegates of the European member organizations at the EuroConference which takes place every three years. The presidium of FIMCAP Europe consists of four members: three members of the pool of presidents and a spiritual assistant. The elected members of the pool of presidents distribute the responsibilities of the presidium among themselves. These tasks include the representation of FIMCAP Europe in the Intercontinental Bureau Meeting, coordinating activities of FIMCAP Europe, and representing FIMCAP Europe externally. The spiritual assistant consults FIMCAP Europe concerning spiritual and theological issues. The current members of the presidium of FIMCAP Europe are:

Position	Name	Member organization / Country
Member of the presidium	Radu-Marian Băsău	AGLT Romania
Member of the presidium	Olaf van Heuven	Jong Nederland Netherlands
Member of the presidium	Johannes Van Overmeire	Chirojeugd Vlaanderen Belgium

==== Member organizations in Europe ====
Country	Name	Acronym	Status
Romania	Asociația Grupurilor Locale de Tineret	AGLT	Associate
Lithuania	Ateitis		Full
Belgium	**Chirojeugd Vlaanderen**	Chiro	Full
Spain / Catalonia	Moviment de Centres d'Esplais Cristians Catalans	MCECC	Full
Slovakia	eRko – Hnutie kresťanských spoločenstiev detí	eRko	Full
Italy	Forum Oratori Italiani	FOI	Full
Denmark / Schleswig-Holstein	Frivilligt Drenge- og Pige-Forbund	FDF	Associate
the Netherlands	**Jong Nederland**	JN	Full
Switzerland	Jungwacht Blauring	JuBla	Full
Germany	**Katholische junge Gemeinde**	KjG	Full
Austria / South Tyrol	Katholische Jungschar		Full
Belgium	**Fédération Nationale des Patros**	Patro	Associate
Georgia	Umbrella		Associate
Malta	Żgħażagħ Azzjoni Kattolika	ŻAK	Full

=== Member organizations in Africa ===
Country	Name	Acronym	Status
Burundi	**Chiro Burundi**		Full
Botswana	Chiro Botswana		Full
South Africa / Lesotho	Chiro South Africa		Full
Ghana	Catholic Youth Organization Ghana	CYO Ghana	Full
Nigeria	Catholic Youth Organization Nigeria	CYO Nigeria	Full
Sierra Leone	Catholic Youth Organisation Sierra Leone	CYO Sierra Leone	Full
DRC	**Kiro Congo**	KCD	Full
Burundi	Xaveri Burundi		Full
DRC	Xaveri Congo		Full
Rwanda	Xaveri Rwanda		Full
South Africa	Xaveri South Africa		Full
Uganda	Xaveri Uganda		Full

=== Member organizations in Asia ===
Country	Name	Acronym	Status
Philippines	**Chiro Youth Movement Philippines**		Full
India	Indian Catholic Youth Movement	ICYM	Full
India	Syro-Malabar Youth Movement	SMYM	Full
Sri Lanka	Kithu Dana Pubuduwa		Full
South Korea	Hatsal Youth Ministry Institute		Full

=== Member organizations in Latin America ===
Country	Name	Acronym	Status
Chile	Juventud Parroquial Chilena	JUPACH	Full
Haiti	Kiwo Ayiti		Full
Paraguay	Niños Perseverantes Paraguayos Católico	NIPPAC	Full

== Former members ==
Country	Name	Acronym	Status
France	Société de Saint-Vincent de Paul		
the Netherlands	Katholieke Jongenclubs		
Switzerland	Schweizer Katholische Jungmannschaftsverband		
Canada / Quebec	La Centrale del Patros Quebec		
France	Facel Paris		
Namibia	Namibian Catholic Youth League	NaCaYul	

== General assemblies ==
Number	Year	Country	City	Topic	Other information
0 - Founding Meeting	1961 (7 – 8 October)	Germany	Munich	Founding Meeting	
1st General Assembly	1963	the Netherlands	Leiden	The bases on which to build parochial organizations for the 17+ age group	
2nd General Assembly	1964	Germany	Berlin	The situation of young people between 14 and 17 years old	
3rd General Assembly	1965	Switzerland	Luzern	Youth work in the Third World	Two female organizations (Chiromeisjes Vlaanderen and Kiro Congo filles) ask to be member of FIMCAP and are granted membership as the first female member organizations.
4th General Assembly	1966	Belgium	Brussels	Youthwork in postconciliarian times	
5th General Assembly	1967	Austria	Vienna	The place and formation of small groups – looking towards the Church of tomorrow	
6th General Assembly	1969	Germany	Altenberg	International solidarity	
7th General Assembly	1970	UK	London	Our common base, the present and the future in FIMCAP	
8th General Assembly	1971	Switzerland	Bad Schönbrunn	Common aim and structures	
9th General Assembly	1973	France	Marseille	Our work with the youth of today for tomorrow	
10th General Assembly	1975	Italy	Rome	The organisation of FIMCAP	JUPACH was adopted as full member of FIMCAP.
11th General Assembly	1977	Austria	Vienna	Situation of children and youngsters – children's rights	
12th General Assembly	1979	Switzerland	Luzern	The parish	
13th General Assembly	1981	UK	West Wickham	Relations between the European federations and those of the developing countries	
14th General Assembly	1983	France	Aix en Provence	International Year of Youth – participation, peace and development	
15th General Assembly	1986	Belgium	Westmalle		
16th General Assembly	1989	Belgium	Ryckevelde, Bruges	Living in an intercultural world	
17th General Assembly	1992	Belgium	Bruges	Foreigners	
18th General Assembly	1995	Switzerland	Randa		
19th General Assembly	1998	South Africa	Botha's hill	Youth and sexuality	
20th General Assembly	2001	Ghana	Accra	Young people, protagonists of peace	Ateitis becomes a full member of Fimcap.
21st General Assembly	2004	Spain	Barcelona	Young people in a globalizing world	
22nd General Assembly	2007	Italy	Assisi	Millennium Development Goals	
23rd General Assembly	2010	Germany	Munich	Climate change	CYO Nigeria was admitted as full member.
24th General Assembly	2013	Slovakia	Modra	Children's Rights	AGLT was admitted as Associate member. It is the first non-Christian organization becoming a member of FIMCAP. The General Assembly has adopted a Declaration on "enhancing mobility of young people".
25th General Assembly	2016	Switzerland	Melchtal OW	A child rights-based approach to the sustainable development goals (SDGs)	Hatsal becomes a member of FIMCAP.
26th General Assembly	2019	Belgium	Westmalle	The value of play	Chiro Botswana was admitted a full member of FIMCAP.
27th General Assembly	2023	Germany	Gernsheim	Solidarity	Patro & Umbrella became associate members of FIMCAP.
28th General Assembly	2025	Georgia	Bakuriani	Youth Wellbeing	SMYM became full members of FIMCAP.

== List of presidents ==
=== World presidents of FIMCAP ===
Name	Member organization / Country	Time in office
Alain Ishimwe	Xaveri Rwanda Rwanda	2025-2028
Tamara Vasquez González	Jupach Chile	2025-2028
Ruben Leeman	Chirojeugd Vlaanderen Belgium	2019-2025
Marie Lavall	KjG Germany	2019-2025
Lourdes B. Galeano Cuellar	NIPPAC Paraguay	2016-2019
James Dsouza	ICYM India	2016-2019
Annette Wahle	KjG Germany	2013-2016
Liese Vandenheede	Chirojeugd Vlaanderen Belgium	2013-2016
Lea Sedlmayr	KjG Germany	2010-2013
Marvic Debono	ŻAK Malta	2010-2013
Holger Witting	KjG Germany	2007-2010
Carme Carrion i. Ribas	CCCCCE Catalonia	2001-2004
Olivier Heyen	Chirojeugd Vlaanderen Belgium	1998-2001

=== European presidents of FIMCAP ===
Time in office	Member of the presidium	Member organization / Country	Member of the presidium	Member organization / Country	Member of the presidium	Member organiAfrican presidents of FIMCAPl assistant	Member organization / Country	
2025-2028	Radu-Marian Băsău	Asociația Grupurilor Locale de Tineret Romania	Olaf van Heuven	Jong Nederland Netherlands	Johannes Van Overmeire	Chirojeugd Vlaanderen Belgium	Vacant	
2023-2025	Fidelis Stehle	KjG Germany	Caspar Coster / Jeppe Amstrup	FDF Denmark / FDF Denmark	Kim Geißler	KjG Germany	Vacant	
2021-2023	Roman Sieler	KjG Germany	Manuela Hirzel	Jungwacht Blauring Switzerland	Alexandria Hansen	FDF Denmark	Vacant	
2017-2021	Bernd Hirschberger	KjG Germany	Matthias Schneider	KjG Germany	Stan Driesens	Chirojeugd Vlaanderen Belgium	Fr. Reuben Gauci	ŻAK Malta
2014-2017	vacant	-	Bernd Hirschberger	KjG Germany	Veronika Švitková	eRko Slovakia	Fr. Reuben Gauci	ŻAK Malta
2011-2014	Magdalena Lewis	KjG Germany / FDF Denmark	Juraj Králik	eRko Slovakia	Vincienne Debono	ŻAK Malta	Fr. Reuben Gauci	ŻAK Malta
2008-2011	Michele Lettieri	FOI Italy	Coen Van Kuijk	Jong Nederland Netherlands	Marah Köberle	KjG Germany	Fr. Josep Lluís Calvís	CCCCCE Catalonia
2005-2008	Jürgen Leuser	KjG Germany	Carla Acerbi	FOI Italy				

Over the years the statutes of FIMCAP Europe have been adapted and the profiles and names of the different positions in the presidium have been changed. Until the pool of presidents was introduced at the EuroConference in Malta in 2017 the presidium of FIMCAP Europe consisted of a president, a vice-president, an activity coordinator and a spiritual assistant. The president was responsible for the representation of FIMCAP Europe in the ICB, the vice-president for the external representation of FIMCAP Europe, the activity coordinator for coordinating the activities of FIMCAP Europe and helping the member organizations with the preparations. The role of the activity coordinator had been introduced at the EuroConference in Switzerland in 2014. It replaced the position of a secretary of FIMCAP Europe.

=== Asian presidents of FIMCAP ===
Time in office	President	Member organization / Country	Vice-president	Member organization / Country	Secretary	Member organization / Country	Spiritual assistant	Member organization / Country
2025-2028	EJ Dolor	Chiro Philippines Philippines	Vacant		Shaira	Chiro Philippines Philippines	Fr. Jacob	SMYM India
2010-2013	Jomon Thomas	Indian Catholic Youth Movement India	Sameera Gayantha Warnakulasuriya	Kithu Dana Pubuduwa Sri Lanka	Marie Gutierrez	Chiro Philippines Philippines	Fr. Ranjana Kavithre	ICMS India

=== African presidents of FIMCAP ===
Time in office	President	Member organization / Country	Spiritual assistant	Member organization / Country
2025-2028	McIvan Vamboi	CYO Sierra Leone		
2023-2025	Jjuuko Augustine	Xaveri Uganda Uganda		

=== Latin-American presidents of FIMCAP ===
Time in office	President	Member organization / Country	Spiritual assistant	Member organization / Country
2025-2028	Italo Florentin Maldonado	NIPPAC Paraguay		
2019-2025	Tamara Vasquez González	Jupach Chile		
