= RFNS Kiro =

RFNS Kiro is the name of the following ships of the Republic of Fiji Navy:

- RFNS Kiro (203), a Pacific-class patrol boat in commission 1996–2016
- RFNS Kiro (MSC-206), ex-USS Warbler (MSC-206), a Bluebird-class minesweeper launched in 1954, in service with Fiji 1975–1995
