= European Youth Goals =

The European Youth Goals are a collection of 11 interlinked goals representing young people's vision for youth policy in the European Union (EU). The European Youth Goals were developed during the 6th cycle of the EU Youth Dialogue. The European Youth Goals were included in the EU Youth Strategy 2019–2027.

== Development of the European Youth Goals ==
The European Youth Goals were developed during the 6th cycle of the EU Youth Dialogue, which took place in 2017-2018 (during the presidency trio of Estonia, Austria and Bulgaria) under the title "Youth in Europe: What’s next?". The aim of the dialogue was to collect voices of young people and to contribute together to creating the EU Youth Strategy 2019–2027. To develop the European Youth Goals comprehensive consultations as well as three EU Youth Conferences took place, one in Tallinn, one in Vienna and one in Sofia. The European Youth Goals are supposed to reflect the views of European youth including especially those who were active in the EU Youth Dialogue.

== The 11 European Youth Goals ==
The European Youth Goals encompass 11 goals:

1. Connecting EU with Youth
2. Equality of All Genders
3. Inclusive Societies
4. Information & Constructive Dialogue
5. Mental Health & Wellbeing
6. Moving Rural Youth Forward
7. Quality Employment for All
8. Quality Learning
9. Space and Participation for All
10. Sustainable Green Europe
11. Youth Organisations & European Programmes
