= Forum Oratori Italiani =

- Abbreviation: FOI
- Type: Italian non-profit youth organization
- Purpose: Catholic youth organization
- Headquarters: Rome, Italy
- Location: Italy
- Members: 1,000,000 members
- Website: www.oratori.org/

Forum Oratori Italiani (FOI) is a Catholic youth organization in Italy. FOI is a member of the Catholic umbrella of youth organizations Fimcap.

== Structure ==
FOI is a national umbrella organization of religious associations and bodies involved in youthwork at parish level in Italy. FOI can count almost 40 member organization and about 6,000 parochial recreation centres, which are called “oratori”. About 1,000,000 young people are attending the activities of FOI. About 150.000 volunteers work for FOI as leaders, catechists and helpers with different roles.
