= Jungwacht Blauring =

- Abbreviation: Jubla
- Formation: Jungwacht: June 26, 1932; 93 years ago / Blauring: September 17, 1933; 92 years ago
- Type: Swiss non-profit youth organization
- Purpose: Catholic children and youth organization
- Headquarters: Luzern, Switzerland
- Location: Switzerland
- Members: 31,000 members
- Website: http://www.jubla.ch/

Jungwacht Blauring (short: Jubla) is a Swiss children and youth organization. Jubla is one of the biggest children and youth organizations in Switzerland. Jubla is a member of the Catholic umbrella of youth organizations Fimcap.

== History ==
The first Jungwacht group was founded on 26 June 1932 in Birsfelden as an organization for young Catholic males. Later more and more other parishes in Switzerland also founded Jungwacht groups. Don Bosco was chosen as patron for the Jungwacht.

In 1933 Blauring was founded as organization for young Catholic females. The term Ring (German for "ring") symbolizes the community and the term Blau (German for "blue") was chosen because blue is the colour of Mary and of the female. Mary was also chosen as patron of Blauring.

In the 1970s Jungwacht and Blauring started cooperating and signed a formal cooperation agreement in the 1990s. In 2009 the two organizations were officially merged at the national level.

== Structure ==
=== Levels ===
Jubla is structured in different levels:

- Group: At local level there are usually regular meetings for children guided by youth leaders. Most of the groups meet once a week.
- "Schar" (= Local group): Several groups which are based at one place form together a local group called "Schar".
- Region: Some local groups are coordinated at regional level.
- Canton: All regions and local groups which are not coordinated in a region are coordinated also at cantonal level.
- National level: All cantonal organizations form together the federal organization.

=== Cantonal organizations ===
Cantonal organization of Jubla
| Aargau
| Bern
/ | Basel-Stadt / Basel-Landschaft
| Fribourg
| Graubünden
| Lucerne
/ | Nidwalden / Obwalden
/ / / | St. Gallen / Appenzell Ausserrhoden / Appenzell Innerrhoden / Glarus
| Schaffhausen
| Solothurn
/ | Uri / Schwyz
| Thurgau
] | Valais
] | Zug
| Zürich
