= Żgħażagħ Azzjoni Kattolika =

Catholic youth organisation in Malta

- Abbreviation: ŻAK, ZAK Malta
- Type: Maltese non-profit youth organization and registered NGO
- Purpose: Roman Catholic youth organization, Catholic Action
- Headquarters: Birkirkara, Malta
- Location: Malta
- Members: ~400 members
- Website: zakmalta.org

Żgħażagħ Azzjoni Kattolika (ŻAK) (English: "Youth Catholic Action") is a youth organization as part of the Catholic Action in Malta. It is a wide national organization of the Roman Catholic Church in Malta. ŻAK is a member of the Catholic umbrella of youth organizations Fimcap.

== Status and organization ==
As the Roman Catholic faith is predominant in Malta, ŻAK, as youth branch of the Maltese Catholic Action, ŻAK is one of the most important youth organizations in Malta. The Youth Partnership of the Council of Europe and the European Commission listed ŻAK (together with the Maltese National Youth Council, the Maltese Scouts, and the Maltese Guides) as one of the major youth NGOs that has practical knowledge on needs and expectations of young people. ŻAK is one of only 38 chosen NGOs eligible for funding by the Malta Community Chest Fund. In 2005, ŻAK won the National Youth Awareness Prize 2005.

== Description and activity ==
ŻAK is a branch of the Maltese Catholic Action and its purpose is to provide programs for spiritual, social and personal development. The aim of this process is to affirm an individual in his or her proper identity and involve him or her in a relationship with God and others. The structures of ŻAK assist youth leaders and other young people in the administration of youth work activities and support them to organize group meetings of young people as well as other activities like summer camps.

In 2016 ŻAK organized the pilgrimage from Malta to the World Youth Day in Kraków, with a commission to coordinate the pilgrimage from Bishop Charles Scicluna.

In 2018 ŻAK hosted the EuroCourse of FIMCAP.

== See also ==
- Society of Christian Doctrine
