= Catholic Youth Organization =

International Catholic youth movement

- Abbreviation: CYO
- Formation: 1930
- Founder: Bishop Bernard Sheil
- Type: Youth athletics and social service
- Region served: Worldwide
- Affiliations: Catholic Church

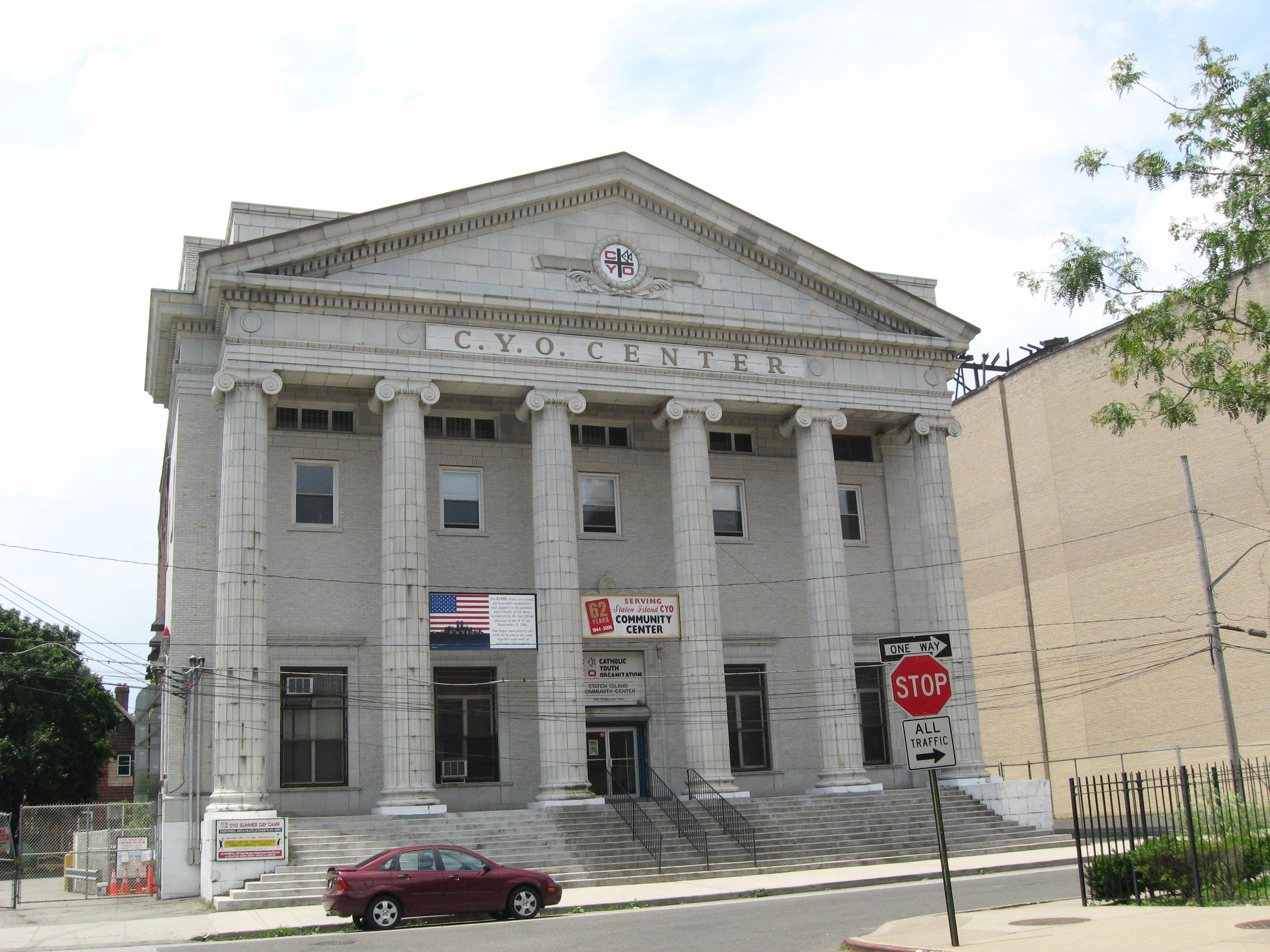
CYO building in Castleton, Staten Island

Catholic Youth Organization (CYO) is an international Catholic youth movement founded by Bishop Bernard Sheil in Chicago in 1930. It became a major factor in the development of race relations in the US Catholic Church after World War II.

== History ==
The first CYO was initiated by prison chaplain and auxiliary bishop Bernard J. Sheil in Chicago in 1930 during the Great Depression. The first CYO was conceptualized as an athletic association. Its aim was to offer young males, especially from the working class, a community and constructive leisure activity in the hope to dissuade them from taking part in criminal activities.

The first CYOs adopted structures similar to the older Protestant youth movement, the YMCA. However, unlike the YMCA, the CYO used Catholic social teachings and New Deal ideology. Furthermore, under the patronage of archbishop George Cardinal Mundelein, it became a core principle of CYO not to discriminate on the basis of race, religion, or gender—as was common in other youth organizations of the time.

CYOs operate around the world in the 21st century.

== Aims ==
The organization's main purposes are guiding the young Catholics to live a Christian life from a young age, developing trust between peers, and living a happy life in a positive manner.

== Activities ==
Usually each group uses the church for meeting and gathering, although some have their own premises. Activities vary in accordance with local culture but often includes prayer, singing, charity, sales, sports and visiting the sick. In the United States, CYO is mainly known for its organized sports programs, notably boxing, basketball, baseball, track and field, and volleyball, as well as drum corps. Its athletic contests are often so competitive that CYO has been jokingly described as "Crush Your Opponents."

== Locations ==
=== United States ===
CYO operates in many dioceses in the United States, following much the same model as in the time of its founding. CYO youth sports leagues are the most recognizable feature, and teams are typically connected to individual parishes.

=== International ===
==== Australia ====
The Catholic Youth Organisation was established in Sydney in 1945 and had a peak membership of 20,000 in the 1950s.

==== Ghana ====
CYO Ghana is a Catholic youth organization in Ghana. At international level CYO Ghana is a full member of the Catholic umbrella of youth organizations Fimcap.

=== CYO Nigeria ===
CYO Nigeria is a Catholic youth organization in Nigeria. At international level CYO Nigeria is a full member of the Catholic umbrella of youth organizations Fimcap.

==== Philippines ====
There are also active units of this organization in the Philippines. Most units are choirs of their parishes, and they also organize various activities under sports, spiritual, social, cultural, formation, ways and means, and membership committees. All of these projects have helped in nurturing the faith of the Filipino Catholic youth, their holistic growth, leadership capabilities, cultural and artistic talents, love for the family, and for the community. CYO in the Philippines was founded by Fr. George J. Willman in the year 1938, with Loreto Parish in Sampaloc, Manila as the pilot unit. Its National Chaplain, emeritus is Msgr. Francisco Tantoco, and Fr. Jerome Cruz as National Chaplain. CYO's Founder's Day is celebrated every 29 June, which is also Fr. George J. Willman's birthday.

==== Sierra Leone ====
CYO Sierra Leone is a Catholic youth organization in Sierra Leone. At international level CYO Sierra Leone is a full member of the Catholic umbrella of youth organizations Fimcap.

== See also ==
- CYO Camp Rancho Framasa
- Fimcap
- World Youth Day
- ECYD
