= ERko – Hnutie kresťanských spoločenstiev detí =

eRko - Hnutie kresťanských spoločenstiev detí
- Abbreviation: eRko
- Type: Slovak non-profit youth organization
- Purpose: Catholic youth organization
- Headquarters: Bratislava, Slovakia
- Members: 8,900 members
- President: Juraj Králik
- Website: www.http://erko.sk

eRko – Hnutie kresťanských spoločenstiev detí (eRko) is a Catholic youth organization in Slovakia. eRko is a member of the Catholic umbrella of youth organizations "Fimcap". eRko is registered at the Ministry of Interior of the Slovak Republic as a non-governmental organisation. eRko is also a member of CIDSE. eRko is based in Roman Catholic parishes as well as in Greek Catholic parishes. eRko is one of the biggest children's organizations in Slovakia.

== History ==
- 1973: During the Communist rule in Slovakia, Catholics were not allowed to organize themselves in organizations. However, nevertheless, some activists started to lead children from Christian families in 1973. Until the 80s, the number of these activists increased, and an underground movement was established. This movement had the goal to help children to become of mature personalities, thus enabling them to contribute to the development of the Church and the society in which they live. The movement wanted to base this formation on the Christian ideals and the utilisation of personal life as the basic substance.
- 1989: The velvet revolution in 1989 increased the liberties for the inhabitants of Slovakia to organize themselves. This encouraged the foundation of various associations by citizens and the performance of miscellaneous activities. Also, the originally "illegal" Christian underground organisations registered officially and started working publicly and freely.
- 1990: After the end of the Cold War it is possible for eRko to register at the Ministry of Interior of the Slovak Republic as an official non-governmental organisation.
- 1995: The project Dobrá Novina was set up.
- 1998: eRko becomes an observer member of Fimcap.
- 1999: eRko organizes the campaign Peace for Sudan. During this campaign, more than 10,000 children from Slovakia, Kenya and Austria sent letters to President El-Bashir and Colonel Garang expressing their hope for peace in Sudan.
- 2002: In 2002 eRko sent the first three volunteers to Nairobi, Kenya. From that time, eRko has gained experience of preparing and sending volunteers to work in the area of development cooperation.
- 2013: eRko becomes a member of CIDSE.
- 2015: eRko hosts the Fimcap EuroCourse 2015. The title of the course is "Enjoy your freedom!".
- 2015: eRko celebrates its 25th anniversary in Košice.

== Aims ==
The aim of eRko is to assist children and young people to become mature responsible Christian personalities involved in the development of the society they live in. eRko wants to implement this vision through the personal example of young volunteers who experience the life in the community together with children. The core values of eRko are: lively faith, joyful service, open community, respect for life, responsibility, and trust.

== Patrons ==
The patrons of eRko are Saint Stephen, Saint Melchior and Saint Mark.

== Activities ==
- meetings in local groups and parishes
- trips, carnivals, summer camps and other activities
- courses, workshops, seminars and trainings for youth leaders
- REBRIK: is a Christian magazine for children. It is issued every month in 12,000 copies.
- LUSK: is a Christian magazine for Christian youth leaders. It is issued every month in 1,000 copies.
- Switch off TV, switch on yourself! campaign:
- Dobrá Novina (English: "Good News"): is the biggest carol singing campaign in Slovakia and one of the biggest charity campaigns by young people in the country.
