= Coordinació Catalana de Colònies, Casals i Clubs d'Esplai =

Catholic youth organization in Catalonia

Coordinació Catalana de Colònies, Casals i Clubs d’Esplai
- Abbreviation: CCCCCE
- Type: Catalan non-profit youth organization
- Purpose: Catholic youth organization
- Headquarters: Rome, Catalonia
- Location: Catalonia
- Members: 32,000 members
- Website: http://www.coordinaciocatalana.org/

Coordinació Catalana de Colònies, Casals i Clubs d’Esplai (CCCCCE) is a Catholic youth organization in Catalonia. CCCCCE is one of the biggest members of the Catalan youth council (Consell Nacional de la Joventut de Catalunya) and a member of the Catholic umbrella of youth organizations Fimcap.

== Structure ==
CCCCCE is an umbrella organization for the youth work in the Catholic Catalan dioceses. It is structured as a confederation of several distinct entities that work in leisure education, associative promotion, and social education across different Catalan dioceses. Rather than a single hierarchical organization, it functions as a secretariat that aggregates federations of Christian leisure centers (Centres d'Esplais Cristians), training schools (Escoles de Formació, Escoles de l'Esplai), and service-providing entities (Serveis Colònies de Vacances). Its primary components include the Moviment de Centres d'Esplai Cristians Catalans (MCECC), the Fundació Esplai Girona - Mare de Déu del Mont, the Fundació Verge Blanca, the Fundació Santa Maria de Siurana, the Fundació Croera, and the Fundació d'Esplais Santa Maria de Núria, all of which maintain their own operational structures while coordinating under the CCCCCE umbrella.

== History ==
CCCCCE was founded in 1957. CCCCCE introduced as first organization in Catalonia the concept of "clubs d'esplais" (English: "leisure clubs"). Later this concept became a model for other youth movements in Catalonia.

== Member organization ==
Name	Sub-groups	Region
Fundació Pere Tarrés	Moviment de Centres d’Esplai Cristians Catalans - Barcelona, Servei Colònies de Vacances, Escola de l’Esplai de Barcelona – Formació, Consultoria i Estudis	Barcelona
Fundació Esplai Girona – Mare de Déu del Mont (Girona)	Coordinació de Centres d’Esplai, Servei de Cases de Colònies, Escola de l’Esplai de Girona	Girona
Fundació Verge Blanca	Moviment de Centres d’Esplai Cristians Catalans - Lleida, Servei Colònies de Vacances, Escola de l’Esplai de Lleida	Lleida
Fundació Santa Maria de Siurana	Moviment de Centres d’Esplai Cristians Catalans - Tarragona, Servei de Colònies de Vacances, Escola de l’Esplai de Tarragona	Tarragona
Fundació Croera	Moviment de Centres d’Esplai Cristians Catalans - Tortosa, Escola de l’Esplai de Tortosa	Tortosa
Fundació d'Esplais Santa Maria de Núria		Diòcesi d’Urgell

== Awards ==
- 1990: Creu de Sant Jordi

CCCCCE was awarded with the Creu the Sant Jordi in 1990.
