= Kiwo Ayiti =

Kiwo Ayiti / Mouvement Kiro d'Haiti
- Formation: 1960
- Type: Haitian Catholic youth organization
- Purpose: Catholic youth organization
- Headquarters: Port-au-Prince, Haiti
- Location: Haiti
- Members: 60,000

Kiwo Ayiti (Creole name) or Mouvement Kiro d'Haïti (French name) is a Catholic youth organization in the Haiti. Kiwo Ayiti is a member of the Catholic umbrella of youth organizations Fimcap.

== History ==
Kiwo Ayiti was founded in 1960 by Flemish missionary following the example of the Catholic Belgian youth organization Chiro Flanders.

== Activities ==
=== International partnerships ===
Kiwo Ayiti is a member of the Catholic umbrella of youth organizations Fimcap. Within Fimcap Kiwo Ayiti has got an intercontinental partnership with Chiro Flanders. The partnership includes mutual visits and exchanges about youth work.

== Organization ==
Kiwo Ayiti has about 60,000 children and young people as members. They are directed by about 4,500 youth leaders and meet in about 600 local groups. Kiwo Ayiti is present in all of the ten dioceses of the Roman Catholic church in Haiti.

Kiwo Ayiti is structured in the following sections (based on age-groups):

Age group	Name of section
3 – 6 years	"la section de plus petits et petites" (the section of the youngest ones)
6 – 11 years	"Tambours" (for boys) and "Étincelles" (for girls)
12 – 14 years	"Combattants" (for boys) and "Vaillants" (for girls)
14 – 16 years	"Vainqueurs" (for boys) and "Conquérantes" (for girls)
17 years and older	"Aspirants" (preparation for group leadership) and group leaders
