= Jong Nederland =

Dutch Catholic youth organization

- Abbreviation: Jong Nederland
- Formation: December 6, 1944; 81 years ago
- Type: Dutch non-profit youth organization
- Purpose: Catholic youth organization
- Headquarters: Tilburg, Netherlands
- Location: Netherlands
- Members: 12,000 members
- Website: www.jongnederland.nl

Jong Nederland is a Catholic youth organization in the Netherlands. Jong Nederland is a member of the Catholic umbrella of youth organizations "Fimcap".

== History ==
Jong Nederland was founded on the sixth of December 1944, right after the southern provinces of the Netherlands were freed of the Nazi occupation. The purpose was to create an organisation for all Catholic youth in the Netherlands and to unite all the different Catholic youth organisations that had existed before the war and that were forbidden after 1941. Not all Catholic Youth Organisations joined Jong Nederland. However, for a long time Jong Nederland was the most important Catholic Youth organisation in the Netherlands.

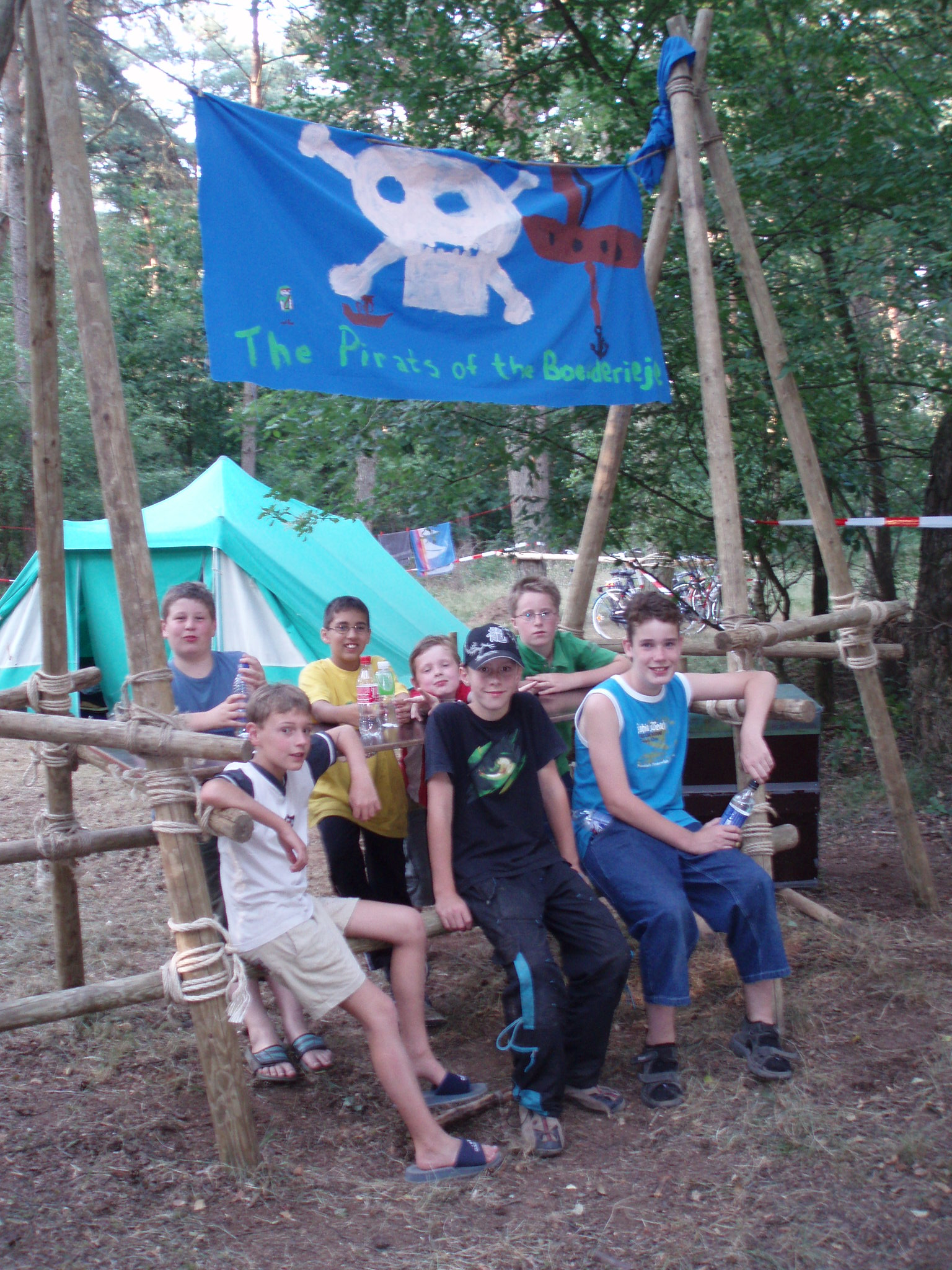
"Maxioren" group at a camp of Jong Nederland

== Organization ==
Jong Nederland is structured in the following sections (based on age-groups):

Age group	Name of section
4 – 6 years	"Minioren"
7 – 9 years	"Maxioren"
10 – 12 years	"Junioren"
13 – 15 years	"Senioren"
16 – 18 years	"16-plussers" (not in all local groups)
18 years and older	"Leiding" (leaders)
