= 37th International Eucharistic Congress =

The 37th International Eucharistic Congress that was held from 31 July to 7 August 1960 in Munich, West Germany, was the 37th edition of the International Eucharistic Congress of the Roman Catholic Church.

== History ==
The site of the 37th International Eucharistic Congress was chosen by Pope Pius XII, who had previously served in Munich as a papal nuncio. Approximately 430 bishops and 28 cardinals attended at the congress, including Cardinal Richard Cushing of Boston, Cardinal Francis Spellman of New York, and Cardinal Albert Gregory Meyer of Chicago from the United States.

== Events ==
=== Opening mass ===
The opening mass of the congress was celebrated on 31 July 1960 on the Odeonsplatz. About 80,000 people attended the mass. Cardinal Joseph Wendel adopted elements of the Liturgic Movement by celebrating the mass not with its back to the people (like in the Tridentinian Rite) but celebrating it looking toward the people and by reading the Gospel not in Latin but in German.

=== Church of atonement near the Dachau ===
During the congress, the foundation stone for a "church of atonement" near the former Dachau concentration camp was laid.

=== Mass on the Theresienwiese ===
The congress was closed by celebrating a Statio Orbis Mass on the Theresienwiese, a large square in Munich on which also the Oktoberfest takes place every year.

=== Fimcap ===
In the course of the 1960 Eucharistic Congress, Catholic youth organizations from different countries met in Munich and held a first delegate conference that prepared the foundation of the Fimcap (International Federation of Catholic Parochial Youth Movements).

== See also ==
- Pontifical Committee for International Eucharistic Congresses
