= Youth movement in Flanders =

In Flanders, the northern part of Belgium, a youth movement (Dutch: jeugdbeweging) is a popular kind of organisation that holds weekly activities for children. Some 275,000 children, which is about 18% of those aged 5–24, are member of such organisations.

Popular ones include Chiro, Scouts en Gidsen Vlaanderen, Katholieke Studenten Actie (KSA), FOS Open Scouting, Katholieke Landelijke Jeugd, and Jeugdbond voor Natuur en Milieu (JNM).

== Day of the Youth Movement ==
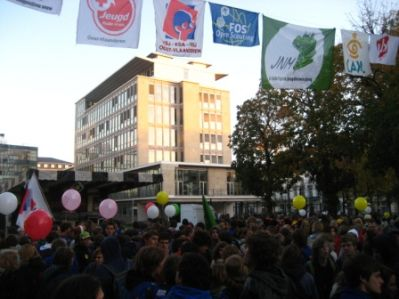

The "Day of the Youth Movement" (Dutch: Dag van de jeugdbeweging) is an event of the youth movement organisations in Flanders, Belgium.

All youth movement organisations stimulate their members to wear their uniforms to work, school, on the train, or wherever you happen to go. That's the basic concept. In addition, breakfast is given to those who present themselves in their uniform, flags raised, some statues are dressed in uniforms,...

Originating in Flanders, the 10th edition (2009) also took place in Wallonia. During the years, the advertising for the event always paid attention to the different uniforms from the organisations.

== Notes ==
Citations
