= Catholic Youth Organization Nigeria =

National Catholic Youth Organization Nigeria
- Abbreviation: CYO Nigeria or CYON
- Type: Nigerian non-profit youth organization
- Purpose: Catholic youth organization
- Location: Nigeria

The Catholic Youth Organization Nigeria (CYON) is a Catholic youth organization in Nigeria. It is a member of the Catholic umbrella of youth organizations Fimcap.

== History ==
CYO Nigeria was founded in 1985 to create a youth organization for young Catholics in Nigeria. The organization emerged in the concern of the Catholic Bishops' Conference of Nigeria (CBCN) that the young Catholics and local Catholic youth organizations in Nigeria should celebrate the International Youth Year (IYY) declared by the United Nations in 1985.

Several meetings of chaplains responsible for youth affairs and youth leaders from the various dioceses of Nigeria took place to plan a national Catholic youth rally. These meetings finally led to the emergence of CYO Nigeria as a nationwide umbrella for Catholic youth work in Nigeria. In 2010, at the General Assembly in Munich, CYO Nigeria was adopted as a full member of the international umbrella of Catholic youth organizations "Fimcap".

The organisation has reportedly collaborated with a Muslim youth organization to promote peace and inter-religious dialogue.

== Activities ==
- Workshops and seminars
- Rallies and conventions
- Camps
- Skills Acquisition
- Cultural and sports festivals
- Exchanges, excursions, and pilgrimages
- Charity work
- Prison visits and prayers for inmates
- Youth counseling
