= Katholische Jungschar =

Katholische Jungschar Österreichs und Südtirols
- Abbreviation: Jungschar
- Formation: 1947; 79 years ago
- Type: Austrian non-profit youth organization
- Purpose: Children's organization
- Headquarters: Vienna, Austria
- Members: 115,000 members
- Website: http://www.jungschar.at/

Katholische Jungschar is the official organization for children of the Catholic church in Austria and South Tyrol and one of the lay movements of the Catholic action. Katholische Jungschar is the biggest children organization in Austria. More 100,000 children take regularly part in its activities. The local groups are run by about 15,000 group leaders. Katholische Jungschar is a member of the umbrella of Catholic youth organizations Fimcap.

== Activities ==
=== At national, regional and diocesan level ===
==== Dreikönigsaktion ====
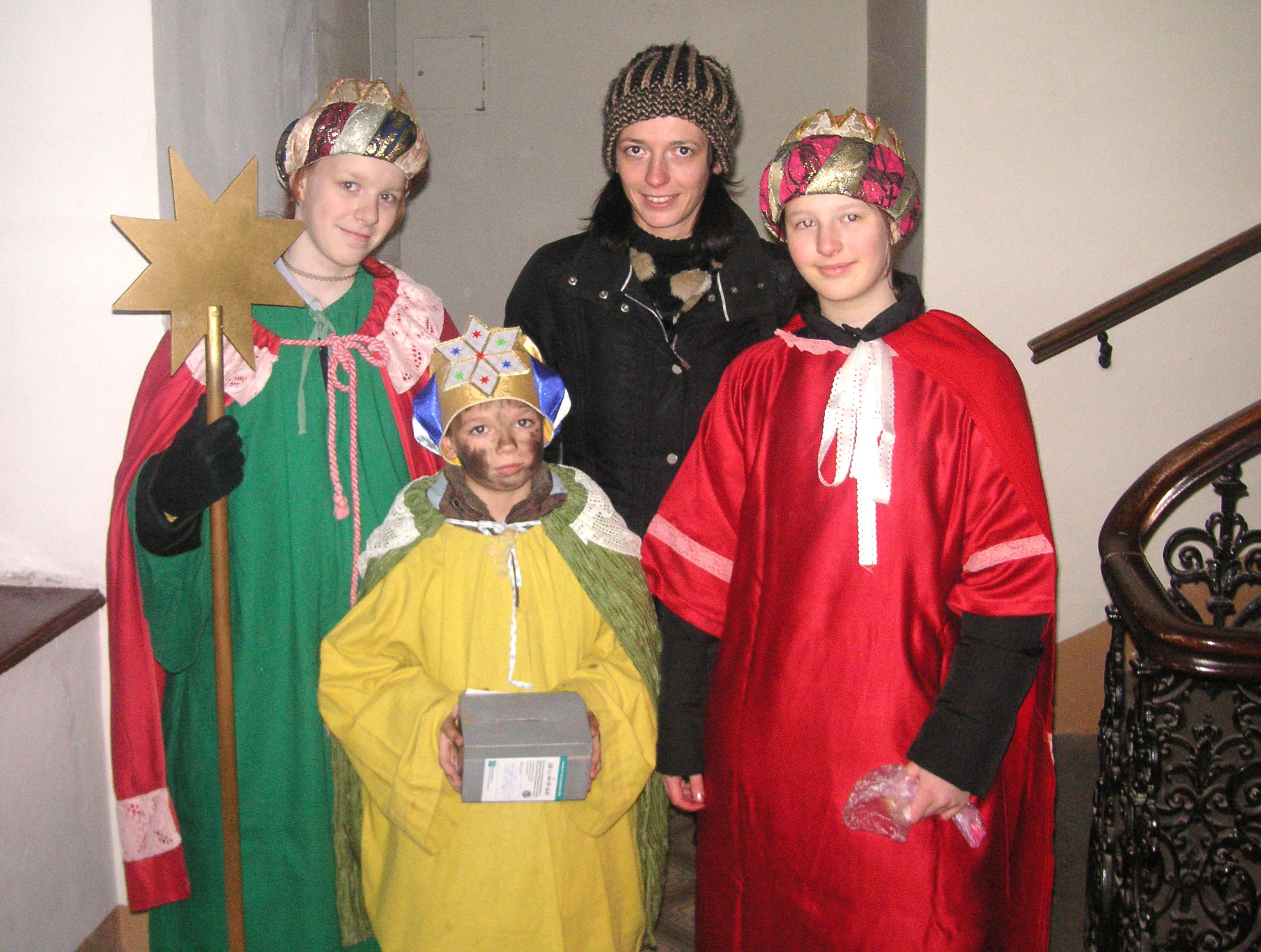
Star singers in Vienna, Austria

"DKA" (Dreikönigsaktion), an aid foundation founded by the youth organization Katholische Jungschar, organizes the biggest carol singing campaign in Austria and South Tyrol. Annually about 85,000 children and 30,000 take part in the "Dreikönigsaktion".

==== Projects and campaigns for children's rights ====
Katholische Jungschar organizes different projects and campaigns promoting children's rights. Every year, it organizes a campaign on 20 November, the Universal Children's Day.

==== Studies on the needs of children and on youth work ====
Katholische Jungschar also conducts and publishes research on the needs of children and on youth work. Together with "Die Kinderfreunde" and the "YOUNG RIGHTS ACTION PLAN" on commission by the Austrian ministry for social security, generations and consumer protection Katholische Jungschar asked children the question "What shall be improved for children and young people?" collecting 25,000 responses.

==== Pilgrimage for altar girls and boys to Rome ====
Katholische Jungschar organizes a pilgrimage for altar girls and boys to Rome.

=== At local level ===
- Altar girls and boys
- Weekly meetings
- Church services
- Camps and excursions
- Star singers, St. Nicholas feasts, etc.

== Thematic work and positions ==
As biggest children organization in Austria, Katholische Jungschar advocates for the interests of children in Austria:

- Child poverty and needs-based minimum benefit system: Katholische Jungschar calls to fight child poverty in Austria. Therefore, the organization stands in against a cutting or a ceiling of the minimum benefits for children.
- Children's rights: Katholische Jungschar promotes the children's rights and advocates for them.
- Prevention of sexualized violence: Katholische Jungschar has developed concepts to prevent sexualized violence and offers educational programs on the topic.
- Human rights: Katholische Jungschar advocates for respecting the Human Rights worldwide.
- Young refugees: Katholische Jungschar calls to respect the children's rights not only for children born in Austria but for all children in Austria, especially also for young refugees. Katholische Jungschar has declared its solidarity with people that were forced to flee from their homes.

== History ==
- 1930s: The term "Jungschar" was used for the first time for Catholic youth organizations in Austria.
- 1938: Catholic youth organizations were forbidden and dissolved by the Nazi government.
- 1947: "Katholische Jungschar" was founded.
- May 2016: In May 2016 the branch of Katholische Jungschar in South Tyrol organized the second edition of a "parliament for children" (German: "Kinderlandtag"). The aim of the project was to give children from all over South Tyrol a voice by giving them a stage to present their ideas and wishes directly to policy makers.
- November 2016: 20,000 children painted and wrote wishes for young refugees on wooden planks, out of which symbolically a boat was constructed which was exhibited in different public places.
