= Chiro Flanders =

Flemish youth organization, founded on Christian values

Chirojeugd Vlaanderen
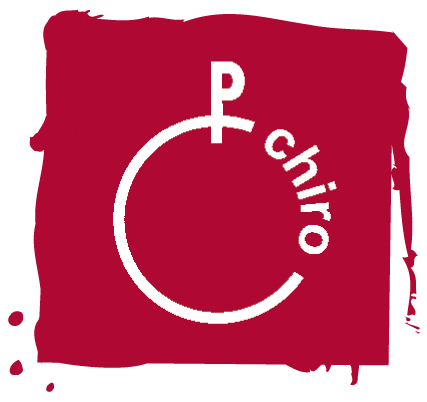
- Abbreviation: Chiro
- Formation: 1934
- Type: Belgian non-profit youth organization
- Purpose: Catholic youth organization
- Headquarters: Antwerp, Belgium
- Location: Belgium
- Members: >100,000 members
- Founder: Jos Cleymans
- Website: https://chiro.be/english

Chiro Flanders (Dutch: Chirojeugd Vlaanderen) or simply Chiro, is a Belgian youth organisation, founded on Christian values, active in Flanders, Brussels and Eupen-Malmedy. With more than 100,000 members, Chiro is the biggest youth organisation in Belgium. While mainly focusing on having fun, it also aims at developing youngsters' responsibility and skills. Chiro is a member of the umbrella of Catholic youth organizations Fimcap.

== Name ==
The name Chiro is a combination of the Greek letters chi (χ) and rho (ρ), which are the first letters of Christos, the Greek form of Christ (see Chi Rho). It was introduced by Jos Cleymans in an issue of Het Katholiek Patronaat, describing the youth of Chiro (Chirojeugd).

== History ==
The Chiro movement emerged from meetings for children after the mass on Sunday called "patronates" teaching Catholic values. In 1934 the Jos Cleymans, a priest and from 1932 secretary of the Flemish Youth Union for Catholic Action (JVKA), used for the first time the term "Chiro" to name the youth movement. The approach of the movement became less formal and changed to an emphasis on playing and activities. He tried to transform the patronates, now called Chiro, into a modern youth movement. At the same expressive practices like banners, songs and marches were introduced to make a common identity of the groups of the movement visible. Cleymans was inspired by the German Catholic youth movements "Quickborn" and "Neudeutschland" as well as by the Scouting movement. During World War II Chiro formulated a concept for its youth work encompassing three pillars:

1. Chiro was structured in different sections based on age groups. Youth was led by youth. Each section was led by a foreman and an assistant.
2. Chiro developed a system of requirements.
3. Chiro introduced a creed. The creed was a poetic text describing an ideal to live.

In the beginning Chiro was an organization only for boys. Later also girls groups of Chiro were founded and also mixed groups emerged. Today there are 282 local groups for girls only, 237 for boys only and 397 mixed groups.

== Structure ==
The members are divided into several sections according to their age. This division is not strict and not always applied in every individual group.

- Ribbels: 6–8 years old (not in every Chiro group)
- Speelclub: 8–10 years old, if there are ribbels, else 6–9 years old
- Rakwi: 10–12 years old, if there are ribbels, else 9–12 years old (rakkers (boys) & kwiks (girls))
- Tito: 12–14 years old (tippers (girls) & toppers (boys))
- Keti: 14–16 years old (kerels (boys) & tiptiens (girls))
- Aspi(rant): 16–18 years old

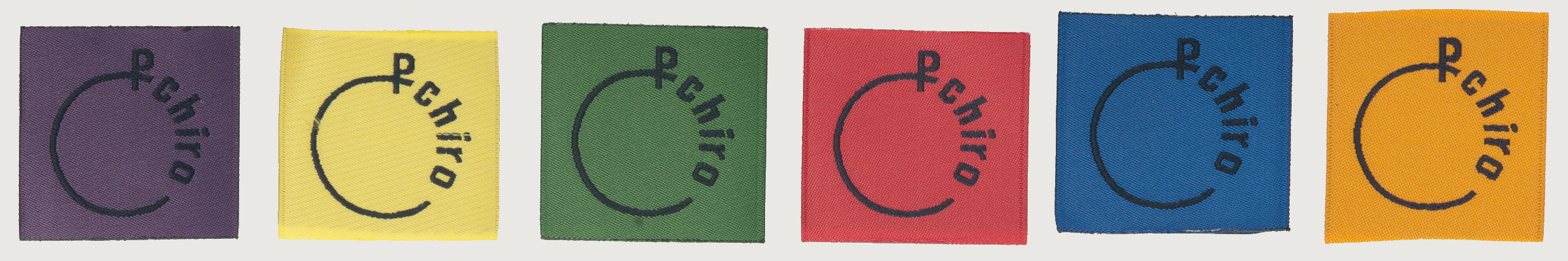
Badges of Chiro symbolizing the belonging to one of the different age groups: "Ribbels" (violet), "Speelclub" (yellow), "Rakwi" (green), "Tito" (red), "Keti" (blue) and "Aspi" (orange)

== Notable Chiro members ==
- Bert Anciaux (former Minister for Culture, Youth and Sport in the Flemish Government)
- Rutger Beke (triathlete)
- Jean-Luc Dehaene (politician, he later transferred to scouts)
- Luc De Vos (Flemish singer Gorki)
- Stijn Devolder (cyclist)
- Piet Goddaer (singer: Ozark Henry)
- Marc Herremans (triathlete)
- Leif Hoste (cyclist)
- Oliver (Eurosong for Kids 2008)
- Kris Peeters (former Minister-President of Flanders, former Belgian Deputy Prime Minister and Minister of Economy and Employment, member of the European Parliament)
- Thor Salden (Junior Eurovision Song Contest 2006)
- Herman Schueremans (CEO Rock Werchter)
- Peter Van de Veire (radio presenter)
- Stan Van Samang (actor, singer)
- Els Van Weert (former Undersecretary for Sustainable Development and Social Economy, former leader of the social-liberal party "spirit")
- Johan Verminnen (singer)
- Inge Vervotte (politician)

For a more elaborated list, please refer to the Chiro website.

== Chiro Organizations worldwide ==
Belgian Missionaries brought the ideas of Chiro into third-world countries. Today there are Chiro organizations in the Philippines (since 1952), Burundi, South Africa, Botswana, Lesotho, D. R. Congo (as "Kiro") and Haiti (as "Mouvement Kiro D'Haiti", since 1960).

All these organizations – including the original Chirojeugd Vlaanderen – are member organizations of Fimcap, which is an Umbrella organization of catholic youth organizations.
