= Catholic Certificate in Religious Studies =

The Catholic Certificate in Religious Studies (CCRS) is a certificate managed and awarded by the Board of Religious Studies on behalf of the Catholic Bishops' Conference of England and Wales. It was introduced in 1991 to replace its predecessors, The Catholic Teachers’ Certificate and the Certificate in Religious Education.

It is designed to:

- provide teachers and those involved in parish ministry with knowledge and understanding of the teaching and beliefs of the Catholic Faith
- develop an appreciation of the principles of Catholic education at all levels
- employ and encourage sound adult educational processes which express Gospel values
- enhance understanding of education within the Church as a lifelong process
- enable all participants to make an informed contribution to their chosen field of work in the Church
- highlight the role and function of Religious Education within the school curriculum.

There are eight modules:

- six core modules (Old Testament, New Testament, Church, Christology, Sacraments and Morality)
- two specialist elective modules

The core modules explore the Scriptures, the Person of Jesus Christ, the Church and its sacramental life and moral understanding.

The specialist modules relate to each participant's ministry in the Church, covering such areas as Religious Education in schools, Parish Catechesis, Liturgy, Justice and Peace. Other modules of a practical nature for teachers, for catechists, for youth workers, for liturgists are available.

Each module requires:

- ten hours’ contact time
- an assignment of 1500 words of equivalent.

The Course is offered in all five Catholic Colleges of Higher Education and at centres in every diocese in England and Wales.

The certificate is issued after all eight modules are passed. There is a maximum time limit of five years from the start of the first module to complete the eight modules.

It is incorrectly thought of as a pre-requisite for a job as a teacher in a Catholic School. However, schools will employ non-CCRS teachers, or ask newly employed teachers to work towards the award if it is decided that it is necessary.

== See also ==
- Catholic Education
- Education
- Religious Education
