= Xaveri South Africa =

Catholic youth organization in South Africa

- Type: South African non-profit youth organization
- Purpose: Catholic youth organization
- Headquarters: ZAF
- Location: ZAF
- Website: https://www.xaveri.org

Xaveri South Africa is a Catholic youth organization in South Africa. Xaveri South Africa is part of the African Xaveri Movement and a member of the Catholic umbrella of youth organizations Fimcap.

== Activities ==
The main activities of Xaveri South Africa are:

- Youth in Local Dialogue
- Education for Intercultural Citizenship
- Media and Arts for Social Change
- Refugee and Migrants project
- Youth Voluntary Service
- Networking, exchanges and civic engagement

== Patron ==
The patron of Xaveri South Africa (as well as from the Xaveri movement) is Saint Francis Xavier. The name of the movement originates from the name of its patron. Saint Francis Xavier is also the patron of African missions.
