= Kiro Congo =

Catholic youth organization in the Democratic Republic of Congo

- Abbreviation: KCD
- Formation: 11 November 1947
- Type: Congolese non-profit youth organization
- Purpose: Catholic youth organization
- Headquarters: DRC
- Location: DRC
- Members: 55,000

The Kiro Congo (KCD) is a Catholic youth organization in the Democratic Republic of Congo. It is one of the more important youth movements in the country. Kiro Congo is a member of the Catholic umbrella of youth organizations Fimcap.

== History ==
Kiro was founded on 11 November 1947. The youth movement grew quickly in the 1950s. In 1957 already about 150 Kiro groups existed in the Democratic Republic of Congo. In 1960 Kiro had already about 240 boys' and girls' groups with approximately 17,000 individual members.

== Organization ==
Kiro Congo is structured in the following sections (based on age-groups):

Age group	Name of section
6 – 12 years	"(Pré-) Bakayouki"
12 – 14 years	"Youpi"
14 – 16 years	"Gens"
16 years and older	"Aspis"

== Activities ==
- Meetings in local groups
- Games, songs, sports, dancing
- Pastoral and spiritual activities on Saturday and Sunday
- Educational activities
- International partnerships

== Intercontinental cooperation ==
- The work of Kiro Congo is supported by the Flemish NGO Broederlijk Delen.
- Kiro Congo is a member of the Catholic umbrella of youth organizations Fimcap.
