= Fimcap World Camp =

Catholic youth camp

The Fimcap World Camp is an international social activity organized by the International Federation of Catholic Parochial Youth Movements (Fimcap). The World Camp is organized every three years hosted by a member organization of Fimcap from another country. The World Camp combines social work with intercultural exchange.

== History ==
List of former Fimcap World Camps

Year	Country
1992	Ghana / Chile
2000	Paraguay
2003	Philippines
2006	DRC
2009	India
2012	Paraguay
2015	Rwanda
2018	Philippines
2022	Botswana
2025	Chile
