= Katholische Junge Gemeinde =

German Catholic youth organization

Katholische junge Gemeinde
- Abbreviation: KjG
- Formation: June 17, 1970; 55 years ago
- Type: German non-profit youth organization
- Purpose: association of young Catholics and Catholic local groups
- Headquarters: Düsseldorf, Germany
- Location: Germany
- Members: 80.000 members in 24 diocesan organizations
- Presidents: Anne Schirmer; Marc Eickelkamp
- Praeses: Eva-Maria Düring
- Secretary-General: Peter Dübbert
- Website: www.kjg.de

The Katholische junge Gemeinde (KjG) is a major German Catholic youth organization. KjG has a democratic structure and local groups throughout Germany, mainly in Catholic parishes, with a total of about 80,000 members. The KjG is a member of the Catholic umbrella of youth organizations, Fimcap, and the German umbrella of Catholic youth organizations, BDKJ.

== History ==
- 1896: The Katholische Jungmännerverband ('Catholic organization of young men') is founded. It is the predecessor organization of the Katholische Jungmännergemeinschaft (KJG, 'Catholic society of young men').
- 1915: The national organization of Katholische Jungfrauenvereine Deutschlands ('Catholic organizations of young women in Germany'), the predecessor organization of Katholische Frauenjugendgemeinschaft (KFG, 'Catholic society of young women'), is founded.
- 1938: Catholic youth organizations were forbidden in Germany by the Nazi regime.
- 1947: The Katholische Jungmännergemeinschaft (KJG, 'Catholic society of young men') is founded.
- 1954: The Katholische Frauenjugendgemeinschaft (KFG, 'Catholic society of young women') is founded.
- 1970: The Katholische Jungmännergemeinschaft and the Katholische Frauenjugendgemeinschaft merge to form the Katholische junge Gemeinde (KjG, 'Catholic youth society').
- 1979: The federal assembly of KjG decides that the organization will advocate for a nuclear power phase-out.
- 1995: KjG adopts the Altenberg Declaration (German: Alternberger Erkärung). In the declaration, KjG emphasizes the importance of spiritual assistants being part of the organization's leadership, and that they need to be elected democratically.
- 2001–2002: KjG calls in their campaign "enjoy the difference" for more tolerance. In particular, the campaign emphasizes that no human being shall be discriminated due to their origin, appearance, race, possession, or other superficial criteria and takes a strong stand against xenophobia.
- 2005: KjG, along with Fimcap, organized a centre for international exchange during the 20th World Youth Day in Cologne named "feel the spirit" and visited by more than 20,000 pilgrims.
- 2010: KjG hosted the General Assembly of Fimcap in Munich.
- 2012: The diocesan branch of KjG in the archdiocese of Munich and Freising hosted the Fimcap EuroCourse 2012.
- 2013: More than 100 groups of KjG took part with projects in the 72 hours campaign, the biggest social campaign of young people in Germany.
- 2014: In an election year for the European Parliament, KjG organized the nationwide project YOUrope – Strippenzieher*innen für eine jugendgerechte EU. The aim of the project was to encourage young people to think about youth rights and to show them possible ways to participate in political processes.

=== KjG and contemporary worship music ===
KjG had a significant influence on the development of contemporary worship music (German: Neues Geistliches Lied, NGL) in Germany.

== Patron and motto ==
The patron of KjG is Thomas More (1477–1535). The motto of KjG is "I never thought of consenting to a matter, if it would defy my morals." This quote is attributed to Thomas More.

== Emblem ==
The emblem of KjG is called Seelenbohrer, 'soul drill'. It was designed in 1967 by Alfred Klever, a designer based in the vicinity of Cologne, during a course on screen printing in Altenberg. It represents the motto of the joint Pentecostal meeting of KJG and KFG, the predecessor organizations of KjG, in Münster in 1968: Zur Antwort bereit! ('Prepared for the answer!'). At this national meeting the meaning of the emblem was explained as follows: "The dot in the center represents Christ, the Good News and the life. The bar moving around the dot symbolizes the humans who, inspired by the center, try to tackle problems and find and give answers. The arrow represents dynamic. Acting based on the solid ground of the Gospel means at the same time to move on and to pursue goals." Another (self-)ironic interpretation of the emblem is that it represents "beating around the bush, closely missing the goal and than move away quickly".

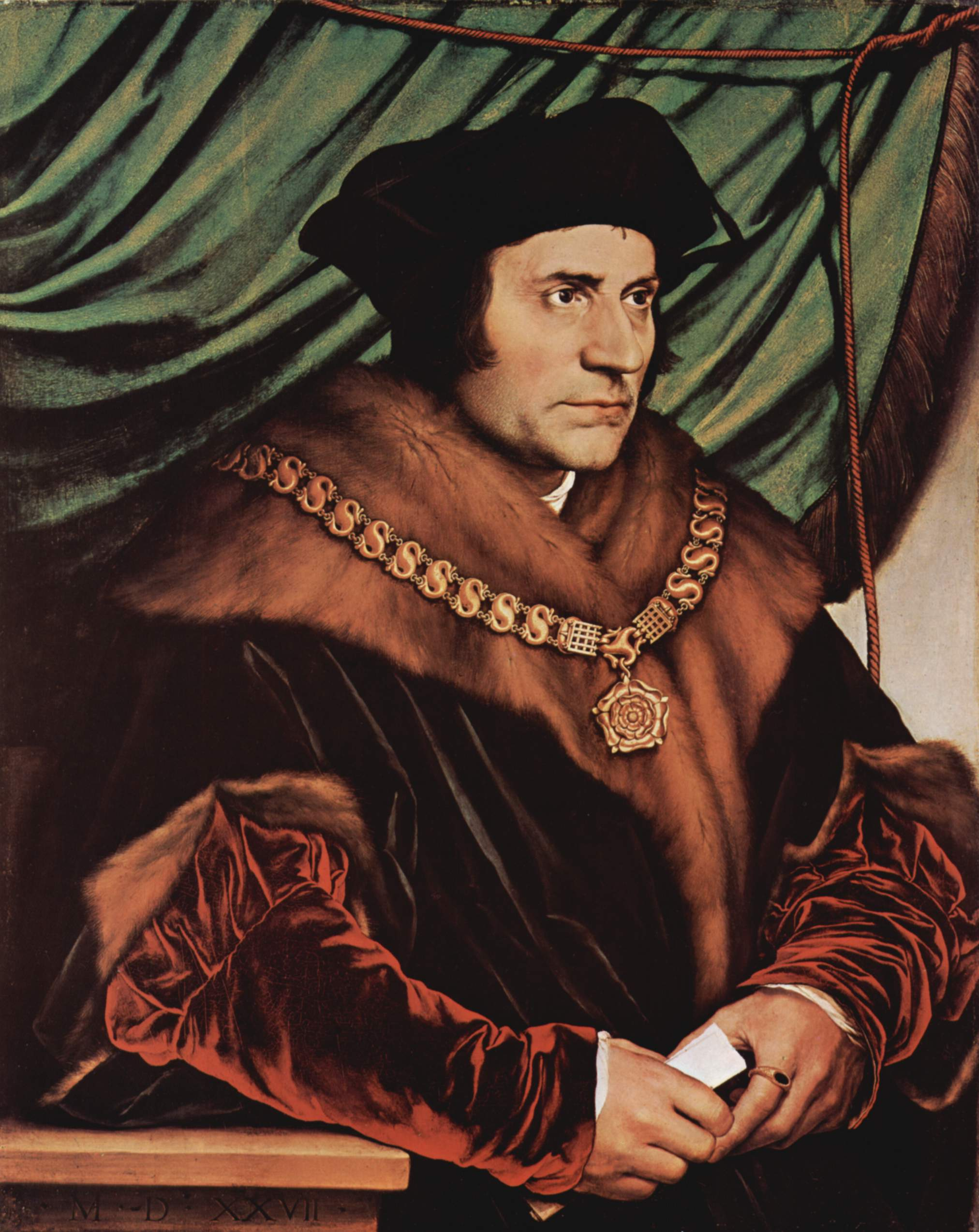
Thomas More – patron of KjG

== Structure ==
=== Local level ===
The 80,000 members are organized in various local groups spread all over Germany. Most local groups are based at a parish. However, local groups can be also located at other places such as schools. Each local group usually has a team of voluntary group leaders which prepare activities like e.g. weekly meetings or camps for children, adolescents and/or young adults. Furthermore, each local group has a board of two or more chairpeople (usually as many female as male chairpeople) coordinating the local group. The chairpeople are elected by the regular assembly of all members of the local group. Usually, all members regardless of their age are eligible to vote (some local groups however require a minimum age of 13 and a maximum age of 27).

=== Diocesan organizations ===
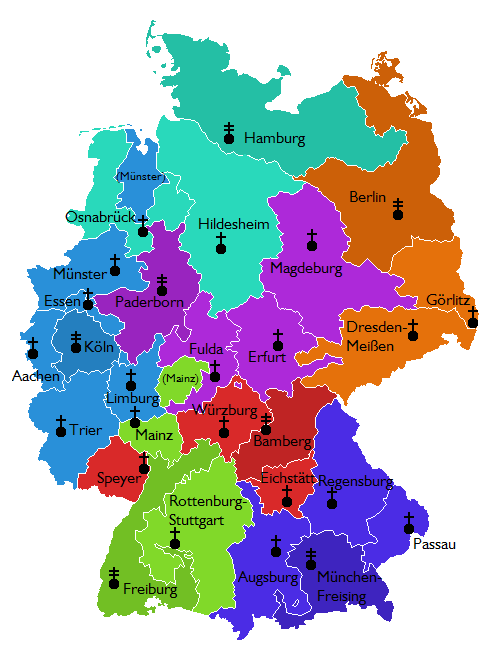

Diocesan organizations of KjG
KjG Aachen
KjG Augsburg
KjG Bamberg
KjG Berlin
KjG Eichstätt
KjG Essen
KjG Freiburg
KjG Fulda
KjG Hamburg
KjG Hildesheim
KjG Köln
KjG Limburg
KjG Magdeburg
KjG Mainz
KjG München & Freising
KjG Münster
KjG Osnabrück
KjG Passau
KjG Paderborn
KjG Regensburg
KjG Rottenburg-Stuttgart
KjG Speyer
KjG Trier
KjG Würzburg

== Notable (former) KjG members ==
- Jens Spahn (German Federal Minister of Health)
- Reinhard Frank (elected head of the district administration of the Main-Tauber-Kreis district, former mayor of Göppingen)
