= Indian Catholic Youth Movement =

- Abbreviation: ICYM
- Formation: 1985
- Purpose: Youth development programme in India
- Headquarters: New Delhi
- Parent organisation: Conference of Catholic Bishops of India

The Indian Catholic Youth Movement (ICYM) is an organization for the Catholic youth from the Latin rite of the Christian community across India.

The patron saint of Indian Catholic Youth Movement is St. Gonzalo Garcia.

Bishop Henry Dsouza, Bishop of Bellary is the Chairman of ICYM. and Most Rev. Mar Joseph Arumachadath Bishop of Bhadravathi is the joint-chairman.
