= Abraham Julios =

Indian Metropolitan bishop (1945–2026)

Mar Abraham Julios
- Bishop of Muvattupuzha
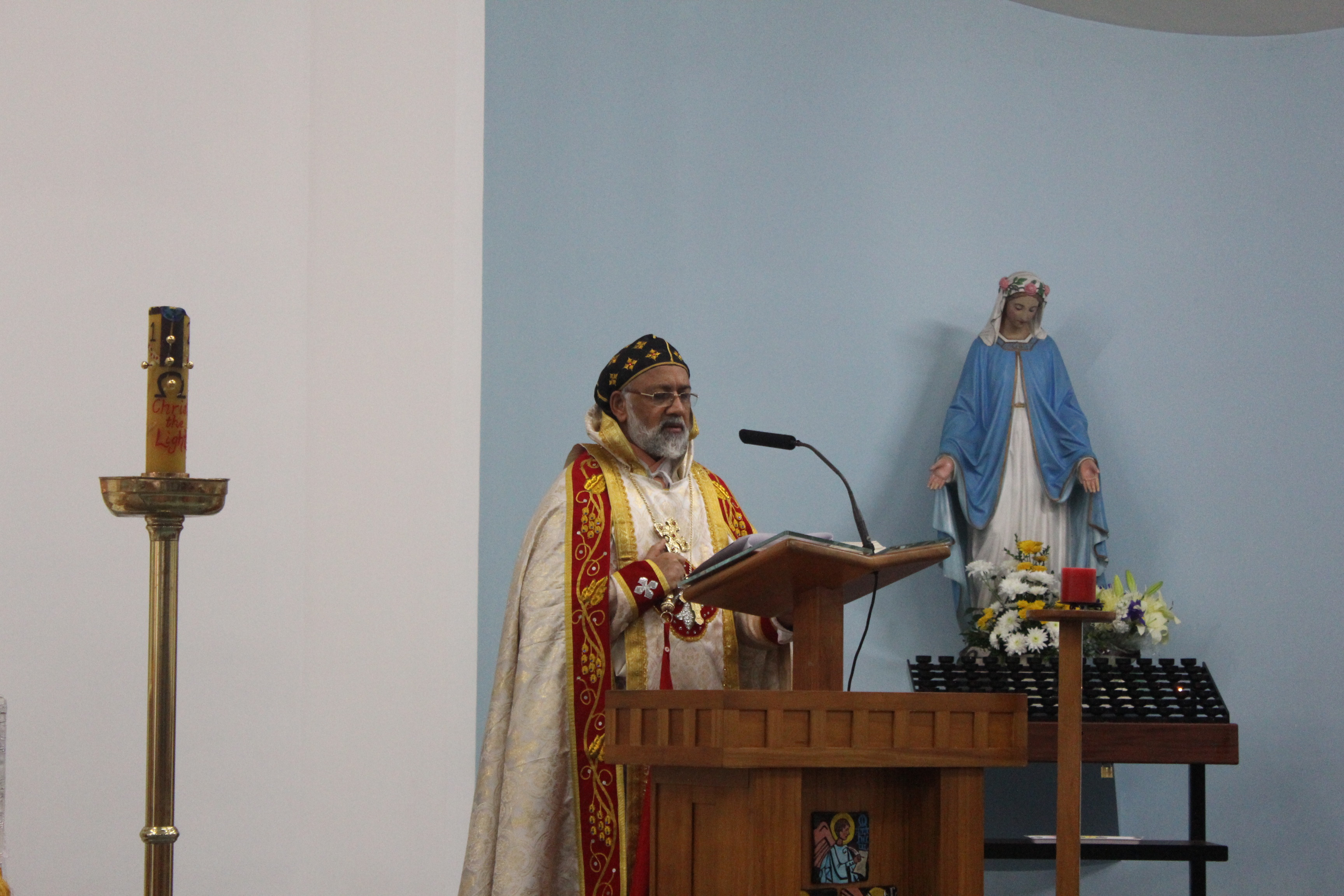
- Church: Syro-Malankara Catholic Church
- See: Diocese of Muvattupuzha
- In office: 2008–2019
- Predecessor: Thomas Mar Koorilos
- Successor: Yoohanon Mar Theodosius

Orders
- Ordination: 1974 (Kashesho), 9 February 2008 (Bishop)

Personal details
- Born: 25 May 1945 Kallooppara, Travancore, British Raj
- Died: 19 September 2026 (aged 81) Thiruvalla, Kerala, India

Abraham Mar Julios (25 May 1945 – 19 September 2026) was the Metropolitan Bishop of the Eparchy of Muvattupuzha of the Syro-Malankara Catholic Church.

== Biography ==
Abraham Mar Julios was born to Varghese Kakkanattil in Padinjaremannil branch of Paramel family, Cherukole-Kozhenchery and Annamma Varghese in the village of Kalloopara, Thiruvalla. Having completed his school education, he joined the Infant Mary Minor Seminary, Thiruvalla in 1961. He completed his philosophical studies in St. Thomas Apostolic Seminary at Vadavathoor, Kottayam. He had his theological studies in Propaganda College, Rome. He was ordained priest by Metropolitan Zacharias Mar Athanasios. After his ordination, he served as parish priest of Mycavu and Ounjil in Kozhikkodu. From 1974 to 1979 Abraham Kakkanattu was the Procurator and the Director of the Social Service Society of the Eparchy of Tiruvalla. Meanwhile, he served as the vicar of the parishes of Thalavadi North and South. In 1978 he started Matha Senior Secondary School in Thumboly, Alleppey district.

In 1979 he was sent to Rome for doing higher studies in Bible and completed his bachelor's degree from Pontifical Biblical Institute in Rome. He also pursued a Diploma in Eastern Languages. He completed scriptural research from Pontifical Urbaniana University in Rome and secured a Doctorate in Biblical Theology. He also secured a Master's Degree in Psychology from the University of Mysore. After the successful completion of his studies, Kakkanattu was appointed the Rector of St. Mary's Malankara Major Seminary, Trivandrum. The construction of the new building for the seminary began during this time. He undertook journeys abroad and discussions and classes in the eparchies of Syro-Malankara Catholic Church with a view of gaining support for the construction of the Seminary.

From 1990 to 1997 he was the vicar of the St. John's Cathedral, Tiruvalla and during this time he started St. John's ITC in Tiruvalla. He had been the president of Horticulture Society, Tiruvalla for seven years. In 1997 he was appointed the vicar of Chengaroor parish and the corporate manager of the School Administration Board of the Eparchy of Tiruvalla. On 5 February 2001, he was appointed the Director of Pushpagiri Medical College, Thiruvalla. He who initiated the Nursing College, Pharmacy College, Dental College, Medicity, Pushpagiri Heart Institute, Cyril Baselios Catholicos Hospital, Primary Health Centers at Pulikunnu, Perumthuruthy and Champakulam, Guest Houses and other related institutions. He relentlessly fought for the constitutional rights of Self Financing Colleges and other Minority Institutions.

On 18 January 2008, he was appointed the Metropolitan Bishop of the Eparchy of Muvattupuzha. He was ordained Remban on 30 January 2008 at St. John's Cathedral, Tiruvalla. Moran Mor Baselios Cleemis Catholicos ordained him Bishop on 9 February 2008 at the Cathedral of Muvattupuzha. He retired as Bishop of the Eparchy of Muvattupuzha on 11 June 2019.

Abraham Mar Julios passed away in Thiruvalla on 19 September 2026, aged 81.

== Sources ==
- Abraham Mar Julios

Catholic Church titles
Preceded by Thomas Mar Koorilos	Bishop of the Syro-Malankara Eparchy of Muvattupuzha; 2008–2019	Succeeded by Yoohanon Mar Theodosius
