= Thomas Anthonios =

Mar Thomas Anthonios
- Bishop of the Syro-Malankara Catholic Eparchy of Gurgaon
- Church: Syro-Malankara Catholic Church
- Appointed: 7 May 2022
- Installed: 30 June 2022
- Predecessor: Jacob Mar Barnabas
- Previous post: Bishop of the Major Archiepiscopal Curia (2010–2015) Bishop of the Syro-Malankara Catholic Eparchy of St. Ephrem of Khadki (2015–2022)

Orders
- Ordination: 27 December 1980 by Cyril Baselios
- Consecration: 25 January 2022 by Baselios Cleemis

Personal details
- Born: Anthony Valiyavilayil; 25 November 1955 (age 70) Adoor,Kerala

Thomas Mar Anthonios (born 25 November 1955) is the current Bishop of the Syro Malankara Catholic Eparchy of Gurgaon since 2022 having previously served as the Bishop of the Eparchy of Saint Ephrem of Khadki and Bishop of the Major Archiepiscopal Curia

== Early Life and Education ==
Thomas Mar Anthonios was born Anthony Valiyavilayil on 25 November 1955 in Adoor, Kerala he joined the Order of the imitation of Christ (OIC) in 1974, following studies in Philosophy and Theology from Jnanadeepa Vidyapeeth Pune. He was ordained a priest by Cyril Mar Baselios on 27th December 1980. He completed a PhD in Oriental Canon Law from the Pontifical Oriental Institute, Rome. He was the director of Bethany Vedvijnana peeth, Institute of Oriental Theology Pune. Followed by serving as the Postulator of the Cause of Canonisation of Venerable Archbishop Mar Ivanios and the Chancellor of the Major Archiepiscopal Curia.

== Episcopate ==
Mar Anthonios was appointed as the Curia Bishop of the Syro Malankara Archeparchy of Trivandrum on 25 January 2010, his Episcopal Consecration was held on 13 March 2010 in Nalanchira Trivandrum, He was consecrated alongside 3 other bishops by Major Archbishop Mar Baselios Cleemis, Thomas Mar Koorilos and Yohannon Mar Chrysostom in a service that was attended by the Melkite Greek Catholic Patriarch Gregory III Laham and Archbishop Raboula Beylouni from the Syriac Catholic Church.

On 26 March 2015 he was appointed as Exarch of the newly created Exarchate of Saint Ephrem of Khadki. On 23 November 2019 he was formally appointed Bishop of the Eparchy of St Ephrem of Khadki. He was appointed Bishop of Saint John Chrysostom of Gurgaon Eparchy on 7 May 2022. His Sunthroniso (Installation) was held on 30 June 2022 at St Mary's Cathedral New Delhi.

Catholic Church titles
Preceded by Post created	Curia Bishop of the Major Archiepiscopal Curia; 2010–2015	Succeeded by Yoohanon Mar Theodosius
Preceded by Post created	Bishop of Khadki; 2015–2022	Succeeded by Mathews Mar Pachomios
Preceded by Jacob Mar Barnabas	Bishop of Gurgaon; 2022–present	Current holder
