= Mathews Pachomios =

Bishop of the Eparchy of St Ephrem Khadki (2024-)

Mar Mathews Pachomios
- Bishop of the Syro-Malankara Catholic Eparchy of St. Ephrem of Khadki
- Church: Syro-Malankara Catholic Church
- Diocese: Syro-Malankara Catholic Eparchy of St. Ephrem of Khadki
- Appointed: December 12, 2023
- Installed: February 15, 2024

Orders
- Ordination: October 9, 1989
- Consecration: February 15, 2024 by Baselios Cleemis

Personal details
- Born: 21 December 1963 (age 62) Kunnathunad, Kerala

Mathews Mar Pachomios is the Eparchial Bishop of the Eparchy of St Ephrem Khadki. He was appointed as the 2nd Bishop of the Eparchy on December 12, 2023.

== Early life and education ==
Mathews Mar Pachomios was born Mathai Kadavil on December 21, 1963, in Kunnathunad, Kerala and was baptised at St Joseph's Knanaya Catholic Church Arunoottimangalam. He studied Philosophy and Theology at Jnana-Deepa Vidyapeeth.

== Ministry ==
After his ordination, He served as vice-rector of Postulants and worked extensively in the Archeparchy of Tiruvalla from 1990 to 1995, serving as a parish priest, diocesan director of youth pastoral care, and managing Bethany Publications and the Bethany Book Centre. After earning a doctorate in theology from the Catholic University of Leuven in 2002, he held various leadership roles, including provincial councillor and provincial superior. He contributed significantly to theological education, serving as secretary of the Theological Commission of the Kerala Catholic Bishops' Council and as a professor at Malankara Major Seminary. In 2021, he was elected as superior general of the Order of the Imitation of Christ.

== Bishop of the Eparchy of St Ephrem Khadki ==
He was appointed on December 12, 2023. He was consecrated by the Catholicos of the Syro Malankara Church Baselios Cleemis, on February 15, 2024 at Khalapur. His Sunthroniso (Installation) was held later on the same day.

Catholic Church titles
Preceded by Thomas Mar Anthonios; Position vacant (2022–2024)	Bishop of the Syro-Malankara Eparchy of St. Ephrem of Khadki; 2024–present	Succeeded by Incumbent
