= Joseph Severios =

Joseph Mar Severios
- Eparch of Tiruvalla
- Church: Syro-Malankara Catholic Church
- Diocese: Eparchy of Tiruvalla
- In office: 25 July 1950 – 18 January 1955
- Predecessor: Jacob Theophilos
- Successor: Zacharias Athanasios
- Previous post: Titular Eparch of Ingila (1938-1950)

Orders
- Ordination: 8 January 1929
- Consecration: 25 May 1933

Personal details
- Born: Joseph Valakuzhy; 7 April 1894 Mallapally, Kingdom of Travancore, British Empire
- Died: 18 January 1955 (aged 60)

Joseph Mar Severus was a Syro-Malankara Catholic Metropolitan Arch Bishop of Tiruvalla. His birth name was Joseph Valakuzhy.

== Biography ==
Joseph Severus was born on 7 April 1894 in Valakuzhy family, a Malankara Syrian Orthodox family. After leaving school when he was 15, he was dedicated to the reading, then entered the seminary. In 1912 he passed his exams and went to college in Tiruchchirappalli, but soon left and went to Serampore University, where he was hired by Geevarghese Mar Ivanios. In 1916 he graduated with a Bachelor of Philosophy. After finishing his education was director of the primary school and missionary in Brahmavare. On 8 January 1929 he was ordained to the priesthood and in 1932 led the seminary in Kottayam. On 25 May 1933 Severus was ordained a bishop and led the Niranam diocese. Although he had a close friendship with Metropolitan Ivanios, he was not a supporter of the reunification of the Churches and was very disappointed when in 1930 Mar Ivanios became a Catholic and formed the Syro-Malankara Catholic Church. In order to better counter the spread of Uniatism, Mar Severus took up deep study of the history of the Church, which he believed would help to find arguments against the truth of Catholicism. However, the study of church history has led to the opposite result and on 29 November 1937 Joseph Mar Severus professed the Catholic faith and was received by Mar Ivanios. On 20 November 1938 he became Auxiliary Bishop of the Archeparchy of Tiruvalla, which later led after the retirement of Jacob Mar Theophilos. Joseph Mar Severus died on 18 January 1955.
