= Syro-Malankara Catholic Eparchy of Bathery =

Eastern Catholic eparchy in Kerala, India

Coordinates: 11°39′50″N 76°16′05″E

Eparchy of Bathery Eparchia Batteriensis
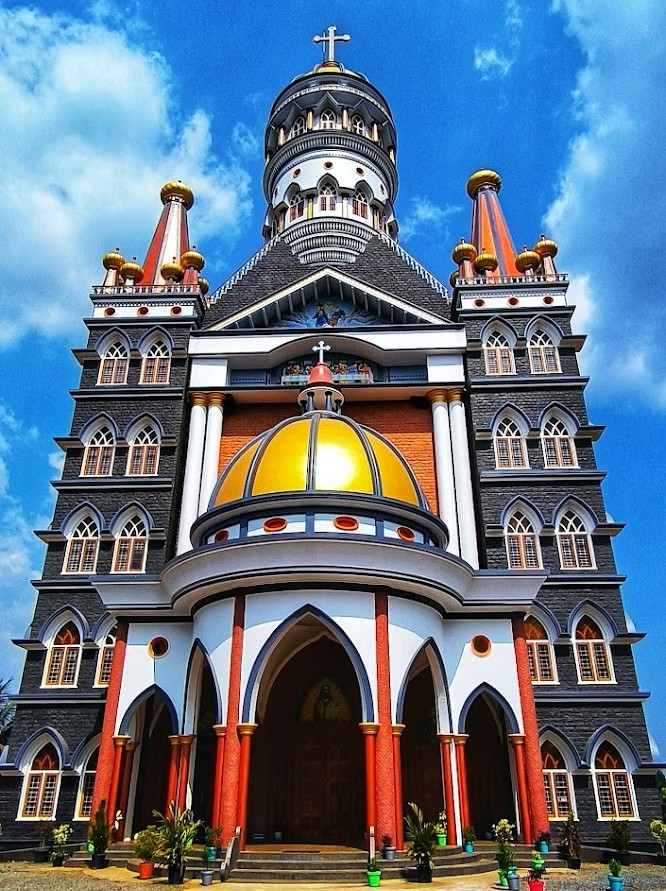
- St Thomas Cathedral, Bathery

Location
- Country: India
- Ecclesiastical province: Tiruvalla
- Headquarters: Sultan Bathery, Kerala, India

Statistics
- Area: 67,482 km^{2} (26,055 sq mi)
- Population: Total; Catholics: (as of 2023); 21,273,000; 40,300 (0.2%)
- Parishes: 117

Information
- Denomination: Catholic Church
- Sui iuris church: Syro-Malankara Catholic Church
- Rite: West Syriac Rite
- Established: 28 October 1978; 48 years ago
- Cathedral: St. Thomas Malankara Catholic Church, Bathery
- Patron saint: Thomas the Apostle
- Language: Syriac

Current leadership
- Pope: Leo XIV
- Major Archbishop: Baselios Cleemis
- Eparch: Joseph Thomas Konnath
- Metropolitan Archbishop: Thomas Koorilos

The Syro-Malankara Catholic Eparchy of Bathery is an eparchy of the Syro-Malankara Catholic Church in Sulthan Bathery, in Kerala, India. As of 2024 Aboon Joseph Mar Thomas was the bishop. The seat of the eparchy is at St. Thomas Syro-Malankara Catholic Cathedral in Sulthan Bathery.

== History ==
The Catholic diocese of Bathery was established in 1978 by Pope John Paul II and was formally inaugurated on 2 February 1979. During the papacy of Benedict XVI the diocese of Bathery was bifurcated and the new diocese of Puttur was erected. This was mainly due to the geographic vastness of the area. As of 2013 there were nearly 25,000 Malankara Catholic faithful in 102 parishes and mission stations in the diocese of Bathery. Geevarghese Mar Divannasios was transferred to the diocese of Puttur and Joseph Mar Thomas appointed as the bishop of Bathery. The eparchy comprises the district of Nilgiris of Tamil Nadu State; Malappuram, Kozhikode, Kannur, Wayanad and Kasargod districts of Kerala State. The diocesan headquarters is situated in Sulthan Bathery in the district of Wayanad in Kerala. The eparchy of Bathery was erected in 1978. It is a suffragan eparchy of the Syro-Malankara Catholic Archeparchy of Tiruvalla.

In 1958 the Holy See extended the jurisdiction of the Eparchy of Tiruvalla further towards the North of Kerala and some districts of Karnataka and Tamil Nadu. After the extension Zacharias Mar Athanasios sent priests to the new regions. Parishes and mission centers were established in different places. Zacharias Mar Athanasios requested the Holy See to bifurcate the Diocese of Thiruvalla and to erect a new Diocese with Sulthan Bathery as its headquarters. Pope John Paul II erected the Eparchy of Bathery on 28 October 1978 and Cyril Malancheruvil was appointed as the first Bishop of Bathery.

Cyril Mar Baselios officially took charge of the Eparchy of Bathery on 2 February 1979, and the new diocese was inaugurated at St. Thomas Pro-Cathedral, Sulthan Bathery. There were around 8,500 Malankara Catholic faithful in 43 parishes and mission stations at the beginning of the diocese. The pastoral care of the community was entrusted to 18 diocesan priests and 2 priests from Bethany Ashram. Bethany sisters and sisters of Deena Sevana Sabha also served in different parts of the diocese. Within a short of time many parishes and mission stations were established in different parts of the Eparchy.

The Apostolate of the Eparchy was organized under various departments. The faith formation of the children, youth, men and women were undertaken by the Apostolate of Catechism, youth ministry, ‘Pithrusangam’ and ‘Mathrujyothis’. The Bible Apostolate Department promotes Bible studies and distributes the Bible. Malankara Catholic Association is the official organization of the Malankara Catholic faithful for the Social involvement and leadership. The Eparchy runs a social programme. The Social Service Centre, named Shreyas, which is the official organ of the Eparchy for promoting Social justice and fellowship, undertakes a programme of mass education, mass mobilization and mass action. The Eparchy also started some educational institutions under the Corporate Educational Agency of the Eparchy for young people of any caste and creed.

Msgr. Mathew Nedungatt and Msgr. Thomas Thannickakuzhy, Msgr. Thomas Charivupurayidom and Msgr. Eldho Puthenkandathil served the Eparchy as its Vicar Generals. The Diamond Jubilee of the Malankara Reunion Movement was celebrated in the Eparchy on 20 and 21 September 1990 at Sulthan Bathery.

Wladislao Cardinal Rubin, the former Prefect of the Congregation for the Oriental Churches visited the Eparchy on 9 January 1981 and inaugurated the Pastoral Council and Parish Senate in the diocese.

After 17 years of service Cyril Mar Baselios left for Trivandrum on 12 December 1995, having been appointed Metropolitan Archbishop of Trivandrum and the Head of the Malankara Catholic Church. Cyril Mar Baselios took charge of the Church and of the Archdiocese of Trivandrum on 14 December 1995. From then until 5 February 1997 the Eparchy was led by Rev. Msgr. Thomas Thannickakuzhy as its administrator. On 18 December 1996 John Paul II appointed Varghese Ottathengil, the then Rector of St. Mary's Malankara Major Seminary, Trivandrum as the new Bishop of Bathery. He was consecrated as Bishop on 5 February 1997 at Mar Athanasios Nagar, Bathery by Cyril Mar Baselios.

Isaac Thottunkal was the vicar general of the eparchy from 1999 to 2001. He was appointed Apostolic Visitor for North America and Europe, and Auxiliary Bishop of the Archieparchy of Trivandrum, on 18 June 2001. Isaac Mar Cleemis was consecrated as bishop on 15 August 2001 at St. Mary's Malankara Catholic Church, Thirumoolapuram, Thiruvalla.

The Eparchy of Bathery celebrated its Silver Jubilee year from 28 October 2002.

Many parishes and mission stations, and social, charitable and educational institutions, were established to the Karnataka region of the Eparchy. The Eparchy of Puttur was declared on 25 January 2010.

The Eparchy of Bathery was bifurcated and the new Eparchy of Puttur was established by the Holy Episcopal synod of the Malankara Catholic Church. Geevarghese Mar Divannasios was appointed as the first bishop of the Eparchy of Puttur. Joseph Mar Thomas was appointed as the third Bishop of the Eparchy of Bathery and enthroned on 13 April 2010. As of 2013 the Eparchy of Bathery comprised the civil districts of Wayanad, Malapuram, Kozhikode, Kannur, Kasargode of Kerala State and Nilgiris of Tamil Nadu. The ecclesiastical districts of the Eparchy were Bathery, Pulpally, Nilgiris, Nilambur, Edakkara, Kozhikode, Mananthavady and Kannur.

There are 87 priests of the diocesan clergy, three priests from Bethany Ashram and one priest from the OCD congregation. Sisters from Bethany Congregation, Daughters of Mary, Deena Sevana Sabha, Holy Spirit Sisters, FMM Sisters, John the Baptist Sisters also serve in the Eparchy.

== Leadership ==
=== Eparchs of Bathery ===
- Cyril Baselios, O.I.C. (28 October 1978 – 6 November 1995), appointed Major Archeparch of Trivandrum
- Geevarghese Divannasios (11 November 1996 – 25 January 2010), appointed Eparch of Puthur
- Joseph Thomas Konnath (25 January 2010 – Present)

=== Another priest of this eparchy who became eparch ===
- Isaac Thottunkal (1986-2001), appointed Auxiliary Eparch of Trivandrum in 2001

== Statistics ==
As of 2008 the eparchy had an estimated 25,600 faithful, in 102 parishes and over 100 missions, with 89 diocesan priests, 12 religious priests, 12 religious brothers, 262 religious sisters, and 27 seminarians.
