= Geevarghese Divannasios =

Bishop of Syro-Malankara Catholic Eparchy of Puthur

Mar Gheevarghese Divannasios
- Bishop of the Syro-Malankara Catholic Eparchy of Puthur
- Church: Syro-Malankara Catholic Church
- Diocese: Syro-Malankara Catholic Eparchy of Puthur
- Appointed: 25 January 2010
- Term ended: 24 January 2017
- Successor: Geevarghese Mar Makarios
- Other post: Bishop of Syro-Malankara Catholic Eparchy of Bathery (1997-2010)

Orders
- Ordination: 20 April 1978
- Consecration: 5 February 1997 by Cyril Baselios

Personal details
- Born: 1 November 1950 Kunnamthanam, Kerala, India
- Died: 16 January 2018 (aged 67) Thiruvalla, Kerala, India
- Buried: St. John's Cathedral, Tiruvalla

Geevarghese Mar Divannasios Ottathengil (1 November 1950 – 16 January 2018) was the bishop of Syro-Malankara Catholic Eparchy of Puthur from 2010 until 2017.

== Early life and ministry ==
Geevarghese Mar Divannasios was born Varghese Ottathengil on 1 November 1950 into a Syrian Christian family in Thalavady near Thiruvalla. He was ordained a priest by Benedict Mar Gregorios in 1978. He served as Rector of the Major Seminary of the Malankara Catholic Church and was appointed Bishop of the Eparchy of Bathery by Pope John Paul II in 1996. Ottathengil's sacerdotal Silver Jubilee was celebrated in 2003. He served as Administrator of the Malankara Catholic Church after the death of Moran Mor Cyril Baselios Catholicos and was later appointed as the first Bishop of the newly erected Eparchy of Puthoor in 2010.

== Resignation and death ==
Mar Divannasios resigned from his position as Eparch of Puthoor due to health issues at the age of 66 in 2017, having been a priest for 39 years and a bishop for 20 years. He died on 16 January 2018 in Thiruvalla, Kerala.

Catholic Church titles
Preceded by Cyril Mar Baselios	Bishop of Bathery; 1997–2010	Succeeded by Joseph Mar Thomas
Preceded by Position established	Bishop of Puthur; 2010–2017	Succeeded by Geevarghese Mar Makarios
