= Syro-Malankara Catholic Eparchy of Gurgaon =

Eastern Catholic eparchy in northern India

Coordinates: 28.5123°N 77.2037°E

Diocese of Gurgaon Eparchiae Gurgaon गुड़गांव सूबा

Location
- Country: India

Information
- Denomination: Eastern Catholic
- Sui iuris church: Syro-Malankara Catholic Church
- Rite: Syro-Malankara Rite
- Established: 26 March 2015
- Cathedral: St. Mary's Cathedral, Neb Sarai
- Patron saint: St. John Chrysostom

Current leadership
- Pope: Leo XIV
- Major Archbishop: Baselios Cleemis
- Bishop: Thomas Anthonios

The Syro-Malankara Catholic Eparchy of Gurgaon was established by Pope Francis on 26 March 2015. This diocese has a huge territory in north India, including 22 of the 29 states of India. At the southern boundary of the diocese are the states of Gujarat, Madhya Pradesh, Chhattisgarh and Orissa. The bishop's residence and chancery is at the Mar Ivanios Bhavan in Neb Sarai, in South Delhi.
