= Syro-Malankara Catholic Eparchy of Muvattupuzha =

Eastern Catholic eparchy in Kerala, India

Coordinates: 9.9669°N 76.5831°E

Eparchy of Muvattupuzha Eparchia Muvattupuzhensis

Location
- Country: India

Statistics
- Parishes: 70
- Schools: 32
- Members: 14,000

Information
- Denomination: Catholic Church
- Sui iuris church: Syro-Malankara Catholic Church
- Rite: Malankara Rite
- Established: 2003
- Archdiocese: Syro-Malankara Catholic Archeparchy of Tiruvalla
- Cathedral: St. Joseph's Cathedral Muvattupuzha
- Patron saint: Mother Mary
- Secular priests: 57

Current leadership
- Pope: Leo XIV
- Major Archbishop: Baselios Cleemis
- Bishop: Yoohanon Mor Theodosius
- Metropolitan Archbishop: Thomas Koorilos

Syro-Malankara Catholic Eparchy of Muvattupuzha is an eparchy of the Syro-Malankara Catholic Church in Muvattupuzha, Kerala, India. The seat of the eparchy is at St. Joseph's Syro-Malankara Catholic Cathedral in Muvattupuzha. It is a suffragan of the Syro-Malankara Catholic Archeparchy of Tiruvalla.

== History ==
The eparchy of Muvattupuzha was erected in 2003 bifurcating the Archeparchy of Tiruvalla.

== Bishops ==
1. Thomas Mar Koorilos (2003–2007)
2. Abraham Mar Julios (2008–2019)
3. Yoohanon Mar Theodosius (from 2019)
