= Thomas Koorilos =

India metropolitan archbishop

Aboon Thomas Mor Koorilos
- Archbishop of Thiruvilla
- Thomas Koorilos (left)
- Church: Syro-Malankara Catholic Church
- See: Archdiocese of Thiruvilla
- Appointed: 26 March 2007
- Installed: 2 May 2007
- Predecessor: Moran Mor Baselios Cleemis
- Previous post: Metropolitan of the Diocese of Muvattupuzha (2003–2007)

Orders
- Ordination: 17 July 1997

Personal details
- Born: 28 March 1959 (age 67) Kadapra-Mannar, Pathanamthitta Kerala

Aboon Thomas Mor Koorilos (born 19 October 1958) is the Metropolitan Archbishop of Tiruvalla, Kerala, India.

== Life and career ==
He was born to Chakkalapadikkal Ninan Varghese and Aleyamma. His native parish is St. Catherine Malankara Catholic Church, Kadapra-Mannar in the district of Pathanamthitta. He completed his primary education in St. Mary’s L.P.School, Thevarakuzhy, upper primary education in Mar Severios Memorial School, Kadapra - Mannar, and secondary education in St. Mary’s School, Niranam and in St. Thomas School, Theveri.

He joined the Minor Seminary of the Eparchy of Thiruvalla on 10 June 1974. He completed his higher secondary education in St. Berchmann’s College, Chenganacherry. He was sent to Papal Seminary, Pune, for his philosophical and theological studies. He was ordained priest on 30 December 1985. Later he served as the Vicar of parishes at Kumali, Vandanmedu, Chettukuzhy, Mulakkaramedu, Kattapana, Pazhayarikandom, Niranam East (Alamthuruthy).

In 1988, he was appointed the secretary to Geevarghese Timotheos. Meanwhile, he was the vicar of parishes at Niranam central and Pandankari. In 1989, he was given the charge of the co-ordinator of the Malankara Catholic Community in Delhi.

He was sent to Rome for higher studies in Canon Law.{1991-1996} He obtained a doctorate in Canon Law from Pontifical Oriental Institute, Rome. After his studies he rendered his services as the Chancellor, and the Judicial Vicar of Eparchy. Pope John Paul II appointed him Auxiliary Bishop of the Eparchy of Tiruvalla on 5 July 1997. He was ordained bishop on 17 July 1997 by Metropolitan Geevarghese Timotheos, at St. John's Cathedral, Tiruvalla. On 15 January 2003, he was appointed first Metropolitan of the Eparchy of Muvattupuzha and was enthroned on 6 February 2003. Mar Koorilos was appointed the second Metropolitan Archbishop of the Archieparchy of Tiruvalla on 26 March 2007, and was installed on 2 May 2007. As of 2013 he was the Secretary of the Holy Episcopal Synod of the Syro-Malankara Catholic Church.

Catholic Church titles
Preceded by Position established	Auxiliary Bishop of the Eparchy of Tiruvalla; 1997–2003	Succeeded by Philippos Stephanos Thottathil
Preceded by Position established	Bishop of the Syro-Malankara Eparchy of Muvattupuzha; 2003–2007	Succeeded by Abraham Mar Julios
Preceded by Baselios Cleemis	Metropolitan Archbishop of Tiruvalla; 2007–present	Succeeded by Incumbent
