= Zacharias Athanasios =

Syro-Malankara Catholic Bishop of Tiruvalla (1909-1977)

- Eparch of Tiruvalla
- Church: Syro-Malankara Catholic Church
- Diocese: Eparchy of Tiruvalla
- In office: 27 January 1955 – 29 September 1977
- Predecessor: Joseph Severios
- Successor: Isaac Youhanon Koottaplakil
- Previous posts: Titular Eparch of Sarepta dei Maroniti (1953-1955); Auxiliary Eparch of Tiruvalla (1953-1955)

Orders
- Ordination: 24 August 1946
- Consecration: 22 April 1954 by Joseph Severios

Personal details
- Born: Cherian Polachirackal; 19 February 1909 Tiruvalla, Kingdom of Travancore, British Empire
- Died: 29 September 1977 (aged 68)

Zachariah Mar Athanasios (born Cherian Polachirackal; 19 February 1909 in Tiruvalla, India – 29 September 1977 in Tiruvalla), was a Saint Thomas Christian Syro-Malankara Catholic Bishop of Tiruvalla. Athanasios was born into a Jacobite Orthodox family on 19 February 1909 in Tiruvalla. He later converted to Catholicism. Athanasios was ordained a priest on 24 August 1946. On 31 December 1953 he was appointed Auxiliary Bishop. His consecration took place on 22 April 1954. On 27 January 1955, after the death of his predecessor, Joseph Mar Severios, he was appointed Bishop. He died on 29 September 1977.
