= Syro-Malankara Catholic Eparchy of St. Ephrem of Khadki =

Eastern Catholic eparchy in India

Coordinates: 18.5679°N 73.8321°E

Diocese of Khadki

Location
- Country: India

Information
- Denomination: Eastern Catholic
- Sui iuris church: Syro-Malankara Catholic Church
- Rite: Syro-Malankara Rite
- Established: 26 March 2015
- Cathedral: St. Mary's Cathedral, Khadki
- Patron saint: St. Ephrem

Current leadership
- Pope: Leo XIV
- Major Archbishop: Baselios Cleemis
- Bishop: Mathews Mar Pachomios

The Syro-Malankara Catholic Eparchy of St. Ephrem of Khadki was established by Pope Francis on 23 November 2019. It is for the Syro-Malankara Catholics of Maharashtra, Goa, Andhra Pradesh, Telangana and parts of Tamil Nadu and Karnataka. It has its pro-cathedral see in the town of Khadki, near Pune, in western India's Maharashtra state.

It was created on 26 March 2015 as an apostolic exarchate, the Apostolic Exarchate of Saint Ephrem of Khadki, an exempt diocese, that is, immediately subject to the Holy See and not part of either province of the particular church. It extends throughout the southern part of India that had formerly not been under dioceses of the Syro-Malankara Church. The mission of the Syro-Malankara church began in 1955 with the founding of Bethany Ashram in Pune for the pastoral care of migrants.

On 23 November 2019 it was elevated in the rank of eparchy and become dependent from Major Archbishop, because of extension of the territorium proprium of the Syro-Malankara Catholic Church.
