= Geevarghese Timotheos =

Indian bishop (1928–2019)

Geevarghese Mar Timotheos
- Eparch of Tiruvalla
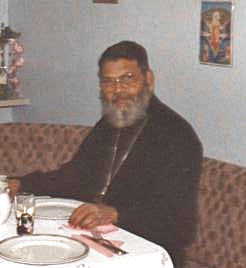
- Timotheos in 1996
- Church: Syro-Malankara Catholic Church
- Diocese: Eparchy of Tiruvalla
- In office: 30 April 1988 – 29 March 2003
- Predecessor: Isaac Youhanon Koottaplakil
- Successor: Baselios Cleemis

Orders
- Ordination: 24 August 1953
- Consecration: 6 August 1988 by Benedict Gregorios

Personal details
- Born: 2 February 1928 Amayannoor, Kottayam Division, Kingdom of Travancore
- Died: 4 June 2019 (aged 91) Thiruvalla, Kerala, India

Geevarghese Mar Timotheos (2 February 1928 – 4 June 2019) was an Indian Syro-Malankara Catholic Bishop of Tiruvalla.

== Biography ==
Geevarghese Chundevalel was born on 2 February 1928 in the family of the Malankara Orthodox priest Jacob Chundevalela. Geevarghese's family adopted Catholicism when he was in high school. In 1943 he entered the junior seminary of the Archieparchy of Tiruvalla, after which he was sent to the Papal Seminary in Kandy, Sri Lanka for philosophical and theological education. Timotheos was ordained on 24 August 1953. He continued his education in Rome at Gregorian University. In 1967 he was appointed rector of the seminary, where he served for thirteen years. In 1980 he became vicar of the Cathedral of Saint John in Tiruvalla. In 1984 Isaac Mar Yoohanon appointed him Bishop of Tiruvalla and made him protochancellor of his diocese. After the death of Isaac Yoohanon in March 1987 he was elected administrator of the diocese and offered to the Vatican as a candidate for the episcopal office. On 6 August 1988 after approval of his nomination he was ordained bishop by Benedict Mar Gregorios. On 29 March 1993 the Holy See accepted his retirement to a small village near Tiruvalla. He died on 4 June 2019 in Tiruvalla, at the age of 91.
