= Jacob Theophilos =

Indian bishop

Jacob Mar Theophilos
- 1st Metropolitan Thiruvalla Eparchy of Syro-Malankara Catholic Church
- Church: Syro-Malankara Catholic Church
- See: Thiruvalla (India)
- In office: 1930–1956
- Predecessor: None (seat created)
- Successor: Joseph Mor Severios

Personal details
- Born: 26 February 1891 Olassa, Kottayam, Kerala
- Died: 27 June 1956 (aged 65) Tiruvalla, Kerala

Jacob Abraham Theophilos Kalapurakal, known as Jacob Mar Theophilos (21 February 1891 – 27 June 1956), was a prominent figure in the Malankara Reunion Movement and served as the first Metropolitan Bishop of the Eparchy of Tiruvalla (now Archeparchy of Tiruvalla) in the Syro-Malankara Catholic Church.

== Early life ==
Born Yakob, he was the eldest son of Abraham Tharakan and Achama of the Kulapurackalveedu family. He was born in Olassa, Kottayam, Kerala. He completed his primary education at a local school and later matriculated from MD High School, Kottayam, where he eventually became a teacher. Influenced by his desire for a religious life and inspired by Fr. P. T. Geevarghese Panikerveettil, (later known as Archbishop Mar Ivanios), who was the Principal of MD High School at the time, Jacob pursued a vocation in the priesthood. He was ordained as a deacon by Metropolitan Vattasseril Mar Divannasios. Later, Jacob accompanied Fr. P. T. Geevarghese Panikerveettil to Serampore, where the latter took up a position as a professor at Serampore University.

== Vocation ==
=== Bethany Ashram and Ecclesial Communion Movement ===
Jacob was a key figure alongside Mar Ivanios in the establishment of Bethany Ashram and later in the Catholic Communion through the Malankara Reunion Movement. Though other Bishops backtracked from the decision of the Synod of Parumala held in 1926, Mar Theophilos endorsed it with full conviction and commitment. Thus he became one among the first five members of the Re-union Movement on 20 September 1930.

He was one of the early members of the Bethany Congregation and served as the Guru (Master) of the Novices. In 1924, he was ordained as a priest and later consecrated as a bishop, taking the name Yakob Mar Theophilos.

=== Bishop of Tiruvalla ===
When the Syro-Malankara Catholic Hierarchy was established in 1932, Jacob was appointed as the first Metropolitan of Tiruvalla. His residence, a modest two-story building named Cherupushpagiri, was located where Pushpagiri Medical College now stands. In 1933, he visited Rome and met with Pope Pius XI.

On 24 November 1934, Jacob blessed a new bishop's residence. He also founded several churches, schools, the Infant Mary Minor Seminary (the first seminary in the Syro-Malankara Catholic Church), and St. Joseph's Press. To promote the faith and support the Re-union Movement, he established a group known as "Sakshyasangam" ("Group of Witnesses").

== Death ==
Jacob, due to mental health issues, transferred the administration of the eparchy to Mar Severios and withdrew from active duties. He died on 27 June 1956, at the age of 65 in Tiruvalla, Kerala. His remains are interred at St. John's Cathedral in Tiruvalla.
