= St. John's Cathedral, Tiruvalla =

Coordinates: 9°22′44.7″N 76°34′13.3″E

St. John's Metropolitan Cathedral
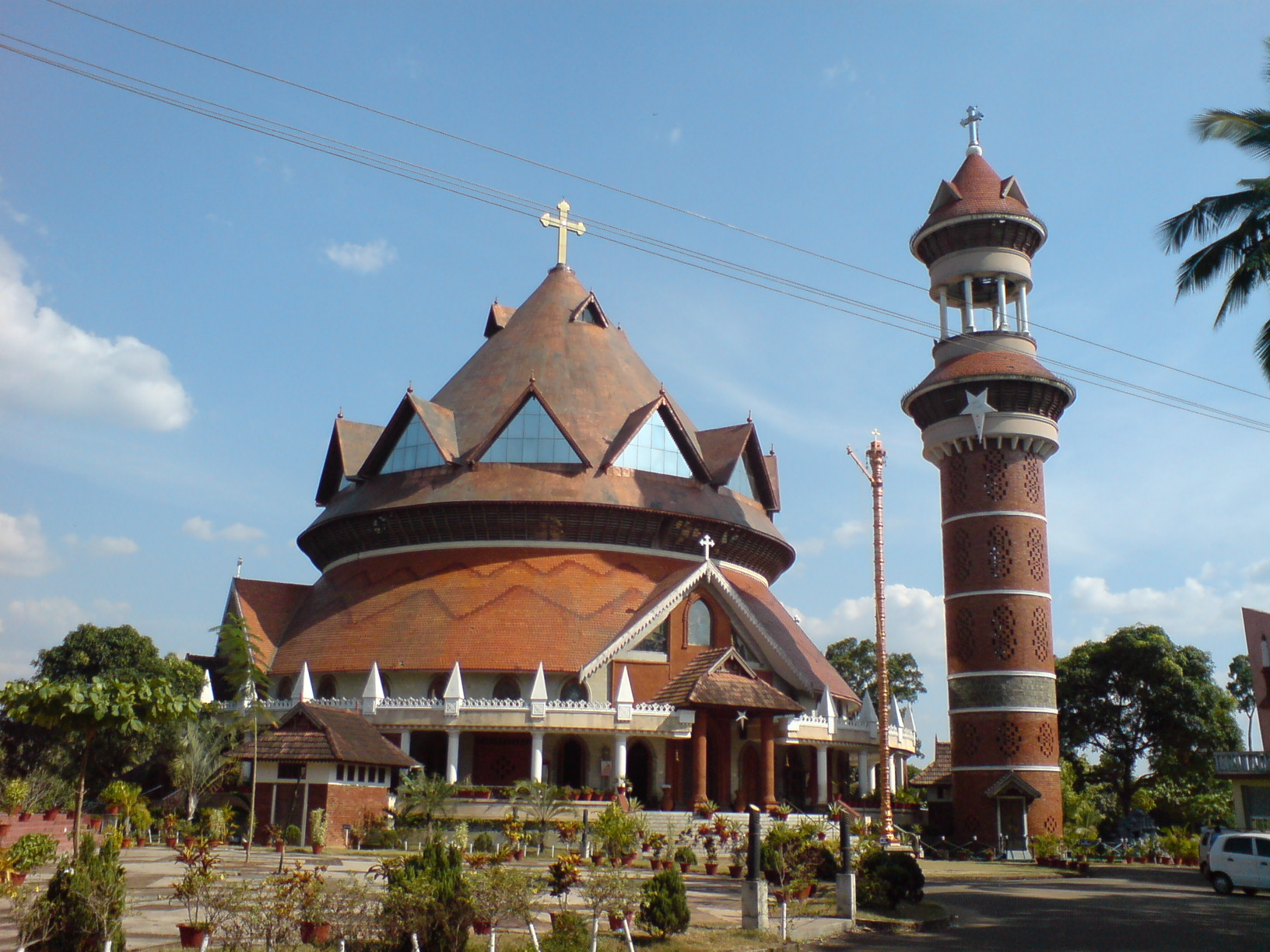
- St. John's Cathedral
- St. John's Metropolitan Cathedral
- Location: Tiruvalla
- Country: India
- Denomination: Malankara Catholic
- Website: www.stjohnsmetropolitancathedral.org

History
- Status: Cathedral

Architecture
- Functional status: Active

Administration
- Archdiocese: Tiruvalla

Clergy
- Archbishop: Thomas Mar Koorilos

St. John's Syrian Malankara Catholic Cathedral is the seat of the Archbishop of the Syro-Malankara Catholic Archeparchy of Tiruvalla.

== Architecture ==
Designed by iconic architect Laurie Baker, the cathedral has a temple-like exterior but a conventional church interior. Aspects of traditional Kerala architecture, temple architecture and Eastern (Syrian) Christian tradition were integrated into the design. The exterior design incorporates elements from the architecture of the old cathedral that it replaced.

The cathedral’s interior has a depiction of biblical themes in stained glass. Three key premises that are shown through these biblical themes are: God in search of man, man in search of God, and man in search of the other. The stained glass images depict the story of the Good Samaritan, The Prodigal Son, The Parable of the 10 Virgins, Zacchaeus, Parables of the Lost Sheep and Coins, the Rich Man and Lazarus, and the Last Judgment; important incidents in the life of Jesus from birth until the resurrection.

== History ==
After the split between the Orthodox faction of the Malankara Orthodox Syrian Church and the group that united with the Catholic church, the Catholic group were in need of places of worship. Hence, after overcoming many obstacles, a chapel was constructed. Infant Mary’s Minor Seminary was started on 8 September 1931 and a temporary chapel came into existence near the seminary. After the erection of the Tiruvalla diocese in 1932, the chapel was upgraded to St. John's Cathedral. In 1943 a new church (third one) was constructed on the same place where the first chapel existed. In response to the call of the Second Vatican Council to regain the cultural heritage of the eastern churches, Bishop Mar Athanasios invited Laurie Baker to design and build a new cathedral in the tradition and culture of Kerala. The circular structure of the church had 12 pillars symbolising the 12 apostles of Christ. There were no pillars in the middle, offering a clear view inside. This cathedral was blessed on 28 December 1972. By the end of the 1990s, the need for the construction of a new cathedral was felt as the old cathedral was on the verge of collapse because its roof was built with wood. The pillars could not bear the heavy load. The current cathedral was constructed on the same place where the third Cathedral (1943) was built, which is a few metres away. This was consecrated in September 2004.
