= Syro-Malankara Catholic Archeparchy of Tiruvalla =

Eastern Catholic archeparchy in Kerala, India

Coordinates: 9°23′06″N 76°34′30″E

Archdiocese of Tiruvalla Tiruvallensis
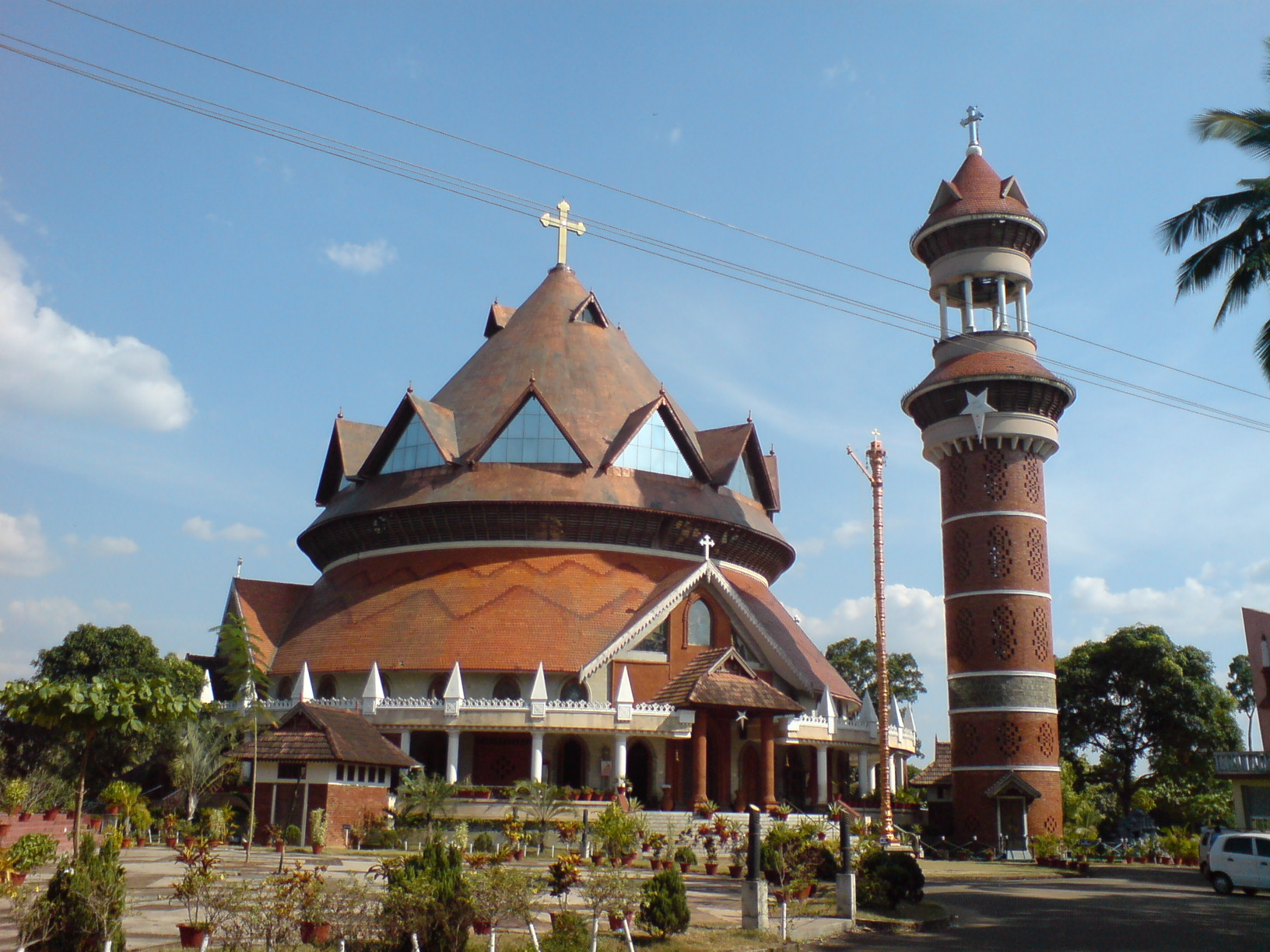
- St. John's Cathedral

Location
- Country: India
- Ecclesiastical province: Tiruvalla

Statistics
- Population: Total; Catholics: (as of 2010); 5,555,000; 37,486 (0.7%)
- Parishes: 133

Information
- Sui iuris church: Syro-Malankara Catholic Church
- Rite: Syro-Malankara Rite
- Established: 11 June 1932
- Cathedral: St. John's Cathedral
- Secular priests: 137

Current leadership
- Pope: Leo XIV
- Metropolitan Archbishop: Thomas Mar Koorilos

Website
- Archeparchy of Tiruvalla Archdiocese of Tiruvalla

The Syro-Malankara Catholic Archeparchy of Tiruvalla is an archeparchy of the Syro-Malankara Catholic Church in Tiruvalla, in Kerala, India. Metropolitan Archbishop Aboon Mor Thomas Koorilos currently presides. The seat of the eparchy is at St. John's Syro-Malankara Catholic Cathedral in Tiruvalla, a circular edifice designed by a British architect.

== History ==
Metropolitan Archbishop Thomas Mar Koorilos releases the Directory of Malankara Catholics in Oman

The eparchy of Tiruvalla was erected in 1932, and raised to the status of an archeparchy in 2006. Its suffragan eparchies are those of Bathery, Muvattupuzha, and Puthur.

== Current bishops ==
The Metropolitan of Tiruvalla is Thomas Mar Koorilos, appointed in 2007.

== Statistics ==
As of 2018, the archeparchy has an estimated 40,000 faithful, in 136 parishes, with 106 diocesan priests, 25 religious priests, 54 religious brothers, 267 religious sisters, and 33 seminarians.

The Archdiocese of Tiruvalla took the initiative in founding the St. Ephrem Ecumenical Research Institute, a constituent college of the University of Kottayam, which specialises in Syriac studies.

The Archdiocese of Tiruvalla took the initiative in founding the Infant Mary's Minor Seminary for priestly formation.

== Saints and causes for canonisation ==
- Jean-Richard Mahieu (François) [Acharya]
