= Baselios Cleemis =

Cardinal, Major Archbishop of the Syro-Malankara Catholic Church

His Beatitude Baselios Cleemis
- Cardinal, Major Archbishop-Catholicos
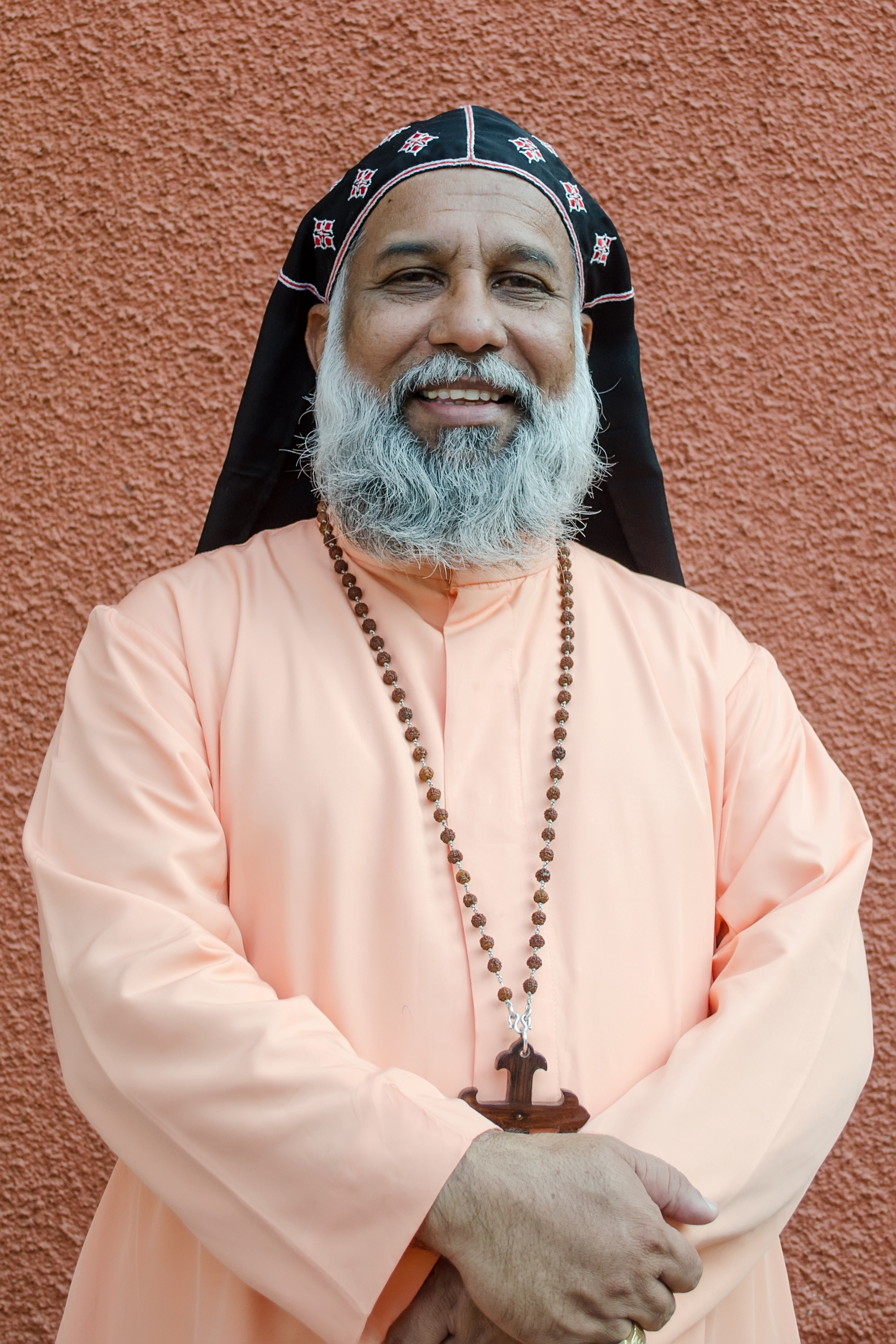
- Baselios Cleemis in 2016
- Church: Syro-Malankara Catholic Church
- Archdiocese: Trivandrum
- See: Trivandrum
- Elected: 8 February 2007
- Installed: 5 March 2007
- Predecessor: Cyril Baselios
- Other posts: Cardinal Priest of San Gregorio VII; Member of the Congregation for the Oriental Churches; Member of the Pontifical Council for Interreligious Dialogue
- Previous posts: Auxiliary Bishop of Trivandrum (2001–2003); Titular Bishop of Chayal (2001–2003); Bishop of Tiruvalla (2003–2006); Archbishop of Tiruvalla (2006–2007)

Orders
- Ordination: 11 June 1986 by Cyril Baselios
- Consecration: 15 August 2001 by Cyril Baselios
- Created cardinal: 24 November 2012 by Pope Benedict XVI
- Rank: Cardinal priest, Catholicos, Major Archbishop

Personal details
- Born: Isaac Thottumkal; 15 June 1959 (age 67) Mukkoor, Thiruvalla, Kerala, India
- Parents: Mathew Thottumkal; Annamma Thottumkal
- Education: SB College Changanasserry, Pontifical Athenaeum Dharmaram Vidya Kshetram, Pontifical University of Saint Thomas Aquinas
- Motto: To unite in love
- Coat of arms

Styles of Baselios Cardinal Cleemis
- Reference style: His Beatitude
- Spoken style: Your Beatitude
- Informal style: Cardinal

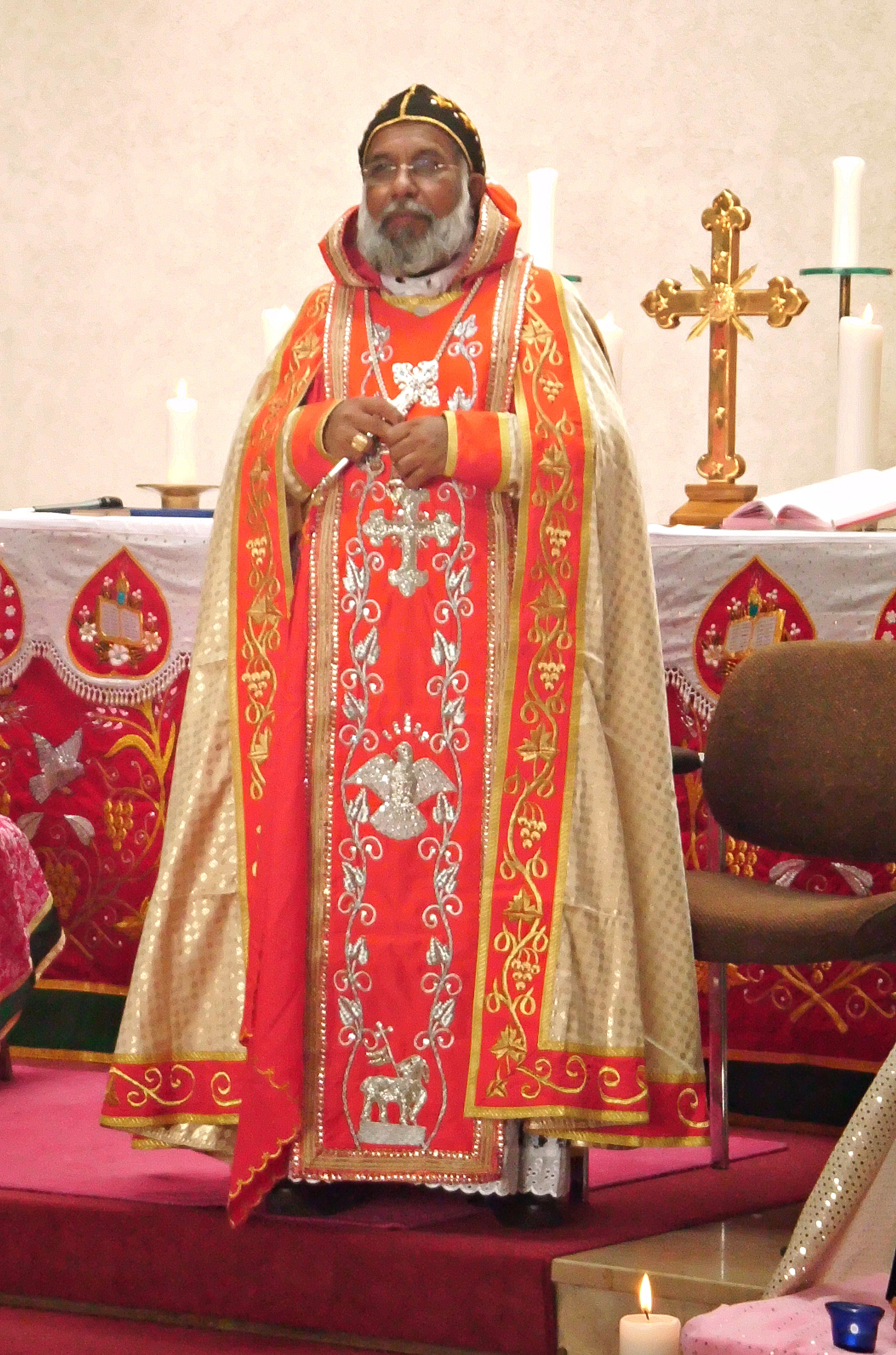
Baselios Cleemis In liturgical vestments, 2015

Baselios Cleemis (born 15 June 1959) is the current Major Archbishop-Catholicos of the Syro-Malankara Catholic Church. He was made a cardinal by Pope Benedict XVI in 2012.

At the time of his elevation, he was the youngest member of the College of Cardinals and the first cardinal from the Syro-Malankara Catholic Church. On 31 January 2013, he was named a member of the Congregation for the Oriental Churches and the Pontifical Council for Interreligious Dialogue. He served as President of the Catholic Bishops' Conference of India from 2014 to 2018, and is currently the president of the Kerala Catholic Bishops' Council.

== Early life ==
Baselios Cleemis was born on 15 June 1959 as Isaac Thottumkal (alternatively spelled as Thottunkal) in Mukkoor, a small village close to Mallappally town in Pathanamthitta district in the State of Kerala in South India. His parents are Mathew and Annamma Thottumkal. The Thottumkal (Powathikunnel Thottumkal) family is a part of the Pakalomattom family, which is an ancient Saint Thomas Christian family in Kerala.

== Education ==
After graduating with BA. Economics from SB College Changanassery, he attended the Minor Seminary Formation in Tiruvalla from 1976 to 1979. He received a B.Phil. degree from St. Joseph's Pontifical Institute, Mangalapuzha, Aluva, where he attended from 1979 to 1982. He received a B.Th. degree from the Papal Seminary, Pune where he attended from 1983 to 1986. Thottunkal was ordained a priest on 11 June 1986. He studied for the Licentiate at the Pontifical Athenaeum Dharmaram Vidya Kshetram, Bangalore where he attended from 1986 to 1989. Thottunkal took his Doctorate in Ecumenical Theology from Pontifical University of St. Thomas Aquinas (Angelicum), Rome in 1997.

== Episcopal career ==
On his return from Rome he became the Vicar General (Proto Syncellus) of the Eparchy of Bathery. Pope John Paul II nominated Aboon Isaac Mar Cleemis as Apostolic Visitor and the Auxiliary Bishop of Trivandrum on 18 June 2001 for the Syro-Malankara Catholic Church residing in North America and Europe. He was consecrated on 15 August 2001 at Tirumoolapuram, Tiruvalla, assuming the name Isaac Mar Cleemis.

The Holy See appointed Cleemis as sixth Bishop of the Eparchy of Tiruvalla on 11 September 2003. Cleemis was installed as the first Metropolitan Archbishop of the Archieparchy of Tiruvalla on 10 June 2006.

Baselios Cleemis was unanimously elected as the Catholicos of the Syro-Malankara Catholic Church through the first Holy Episcopal Synod of election of the Syro-Malankara Catholic Church convoked on 7–10 February 2007 at Catholicate Centre, Pattom, Trivandrum. Pope Benedict XVI approved the election on 9 February and it was announced on 10 February at St. Mary's Cathedral, Pattom, Trivandrum. He assumed the name Baselios Cleemis; Cleemis was enthroned the Second Major Archbishop of the Syro-Malankara Catholic Church on 5 March 2007 at St. Mary's Cathedral, Pattom, Trivandrum. Cardinal Telesphore Toppo and Cardinal Varkey Vithayathil participated in the installation ceremony.

Baselios Cleemis was elevated to the College of Cardinals of the Catholic Church by Pope Benedict XVI on 24 November 2012. As Cardinal-Priest he was assigned the titular church of San Gregorio VII. He is the first bishop of the Syro-Malankara Church and the fifth Keralite to be named a cardinal. He said it was a sign of the Pope's appreciation of Indian Catholics' "unity in diversity", and cited the witness, the defense of human life, and the example of authentic prayer given by Mother Teresa of Kolkata.

On 31 January 2013, Cleemis was appointed by Pope Benedict XVI to serve as a Member of the Congregation for the Oriental Churches and the Pontifical Council for Interreligious Dialogue.

Cleemis participated as a cardinal elector in the 2013 conclave that elected Pope Francis and the 2025 conclave that elected Pope Leo XIV. Because he was the first bishop from the Syro-Malankara Church to be made cardinal, he was also the first cardinal from the Syro-Malankara Church ever to participate as a cardinal elector in a papal conclave.

== Full Name and Titles ==
His Eminent Beatitude Cardinal, Moran Mor Baselios Cleemis Catholica Bava, Major Archbishop-Catholicos of Thiruvananthapuram. Baselios is also a title used in the Eastern Catholic churches for bishops of high rank. This title was granted by the Holy See to the Syro-Malankara Catholic Church on 6 November 1995.

Catholic Church titles
Preceded by Paulos Philoxinos Ayyamkulangara	— TITULAR — Titular Bishop of Chayal; 18 June 2001 – 11 September 2003	Succeeded by Gheevarghese Aprem
Preceded by Paulos Philoxinos Ayyamkulangara	Auxiliary Bishop of Trivandrum; 18 June 2001 – 11 September 2003	Succeeded by Joseph Thomas Konnath
Preceded by Geevarghese Timotheos Chundevalel	Bishop of Tiruvalla; 11 September 2003 – 15 May 2006	Diocese elevated to archdiocese
Diocese elevated to archdiocese	Archbishop of Tiruvalla; 15 May 2006 – 10 February 2007	Succeeded by Thomas Koorilos Chakkalapadickal
Preceded by Cyril Baselios	Major Archbishop of Trivandrum; 10 February 2007 –	Incumbent
Preceded by Cyril Baselios	President of the Synod of the Syro-Malankarese Church; 10 February 2007 –	Incumbent
No prior officeholder	Second Vice-President of Catholic Bishops' Conference of India; 19 February 2008 – 1 March 2010	Succeeded by George Punnakottil
Preceded by Oswald Gracias	Vice-President of Catholic Bishops' Conference of India; 1 March 2010 – 12 February 2014	Succeeded by Andrews Thazhath
Preceded by Eugênio de Araújo Sales	Cardinal-Priest of San Gregorio VII; 24 November 2012 –	Incumbent
Preceded by Oswald Gracias	President of Catholic Bishops' Conference of India; 12 February 2014 – 9 February 2018	Succeeded by Oswald Gracias
