= Tourism in Kerala =

The official logo of Kerala Tourism

Kerala, a state situated on the tropical Malabar Coast of southwestern India, is one of the most popular tourist destinations in the country. Named as one of the ten paradises of the world by National Geographic Traveler, Kerala is famous especially for its ecotourism initiatives and beautiful backwaters. Kerala has unique culture and traditions coupled with its varied demography. Several international agencies ranging from UNESCO to National Geographic have recognised the state's tourism potential. Kerala was named by TIME magazine in 2022 among the 50 extraordinary destinations to explore in its list of the World's Greatest Places. In 2023, Kerala was listed at the 13th spot in The New York Times' annual list of places to visit and was the only tourist destination listed from India.

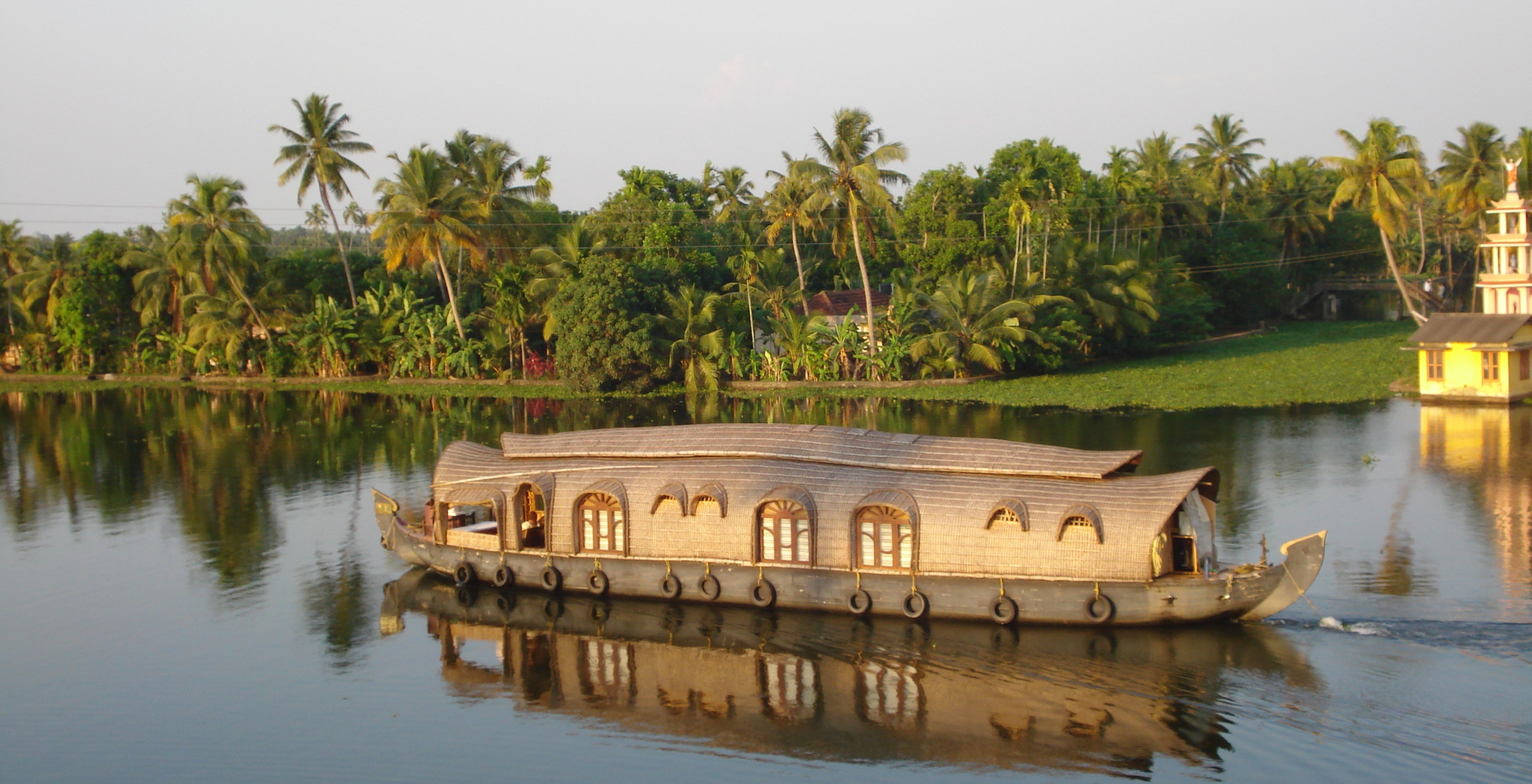
Kerala House Boat, Alappuzha (Alleppey)

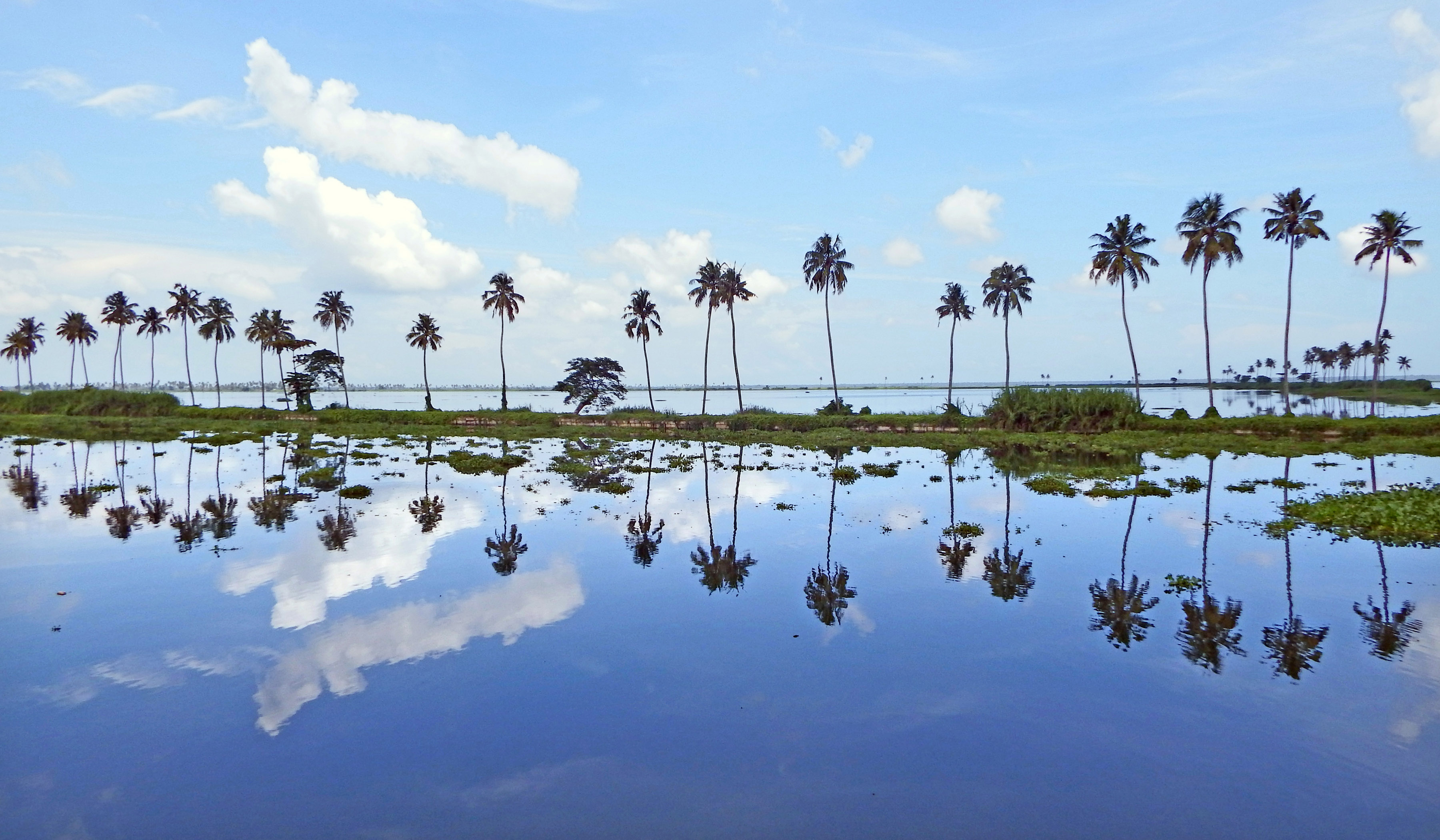
Vembanad Lake

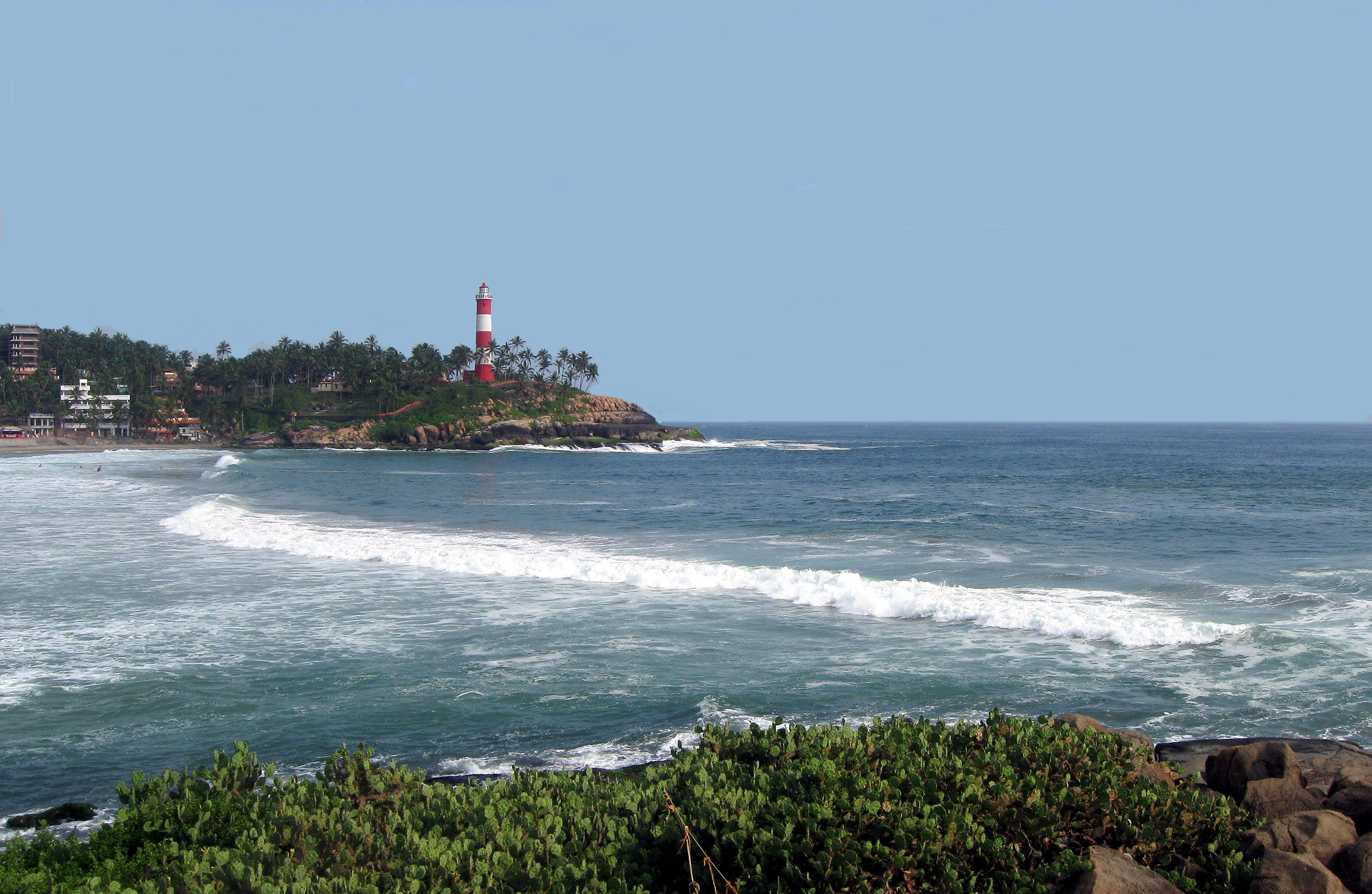
Kovalam Beach, Trivandrum

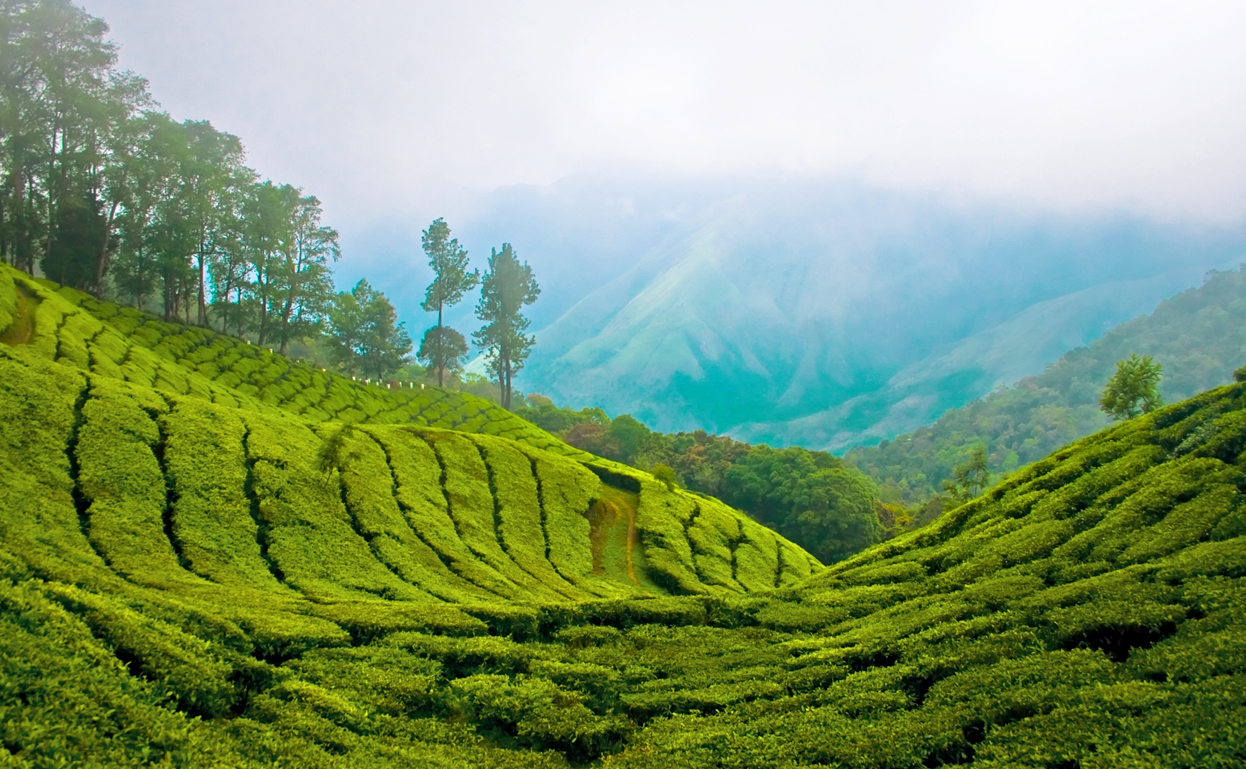
Munnar

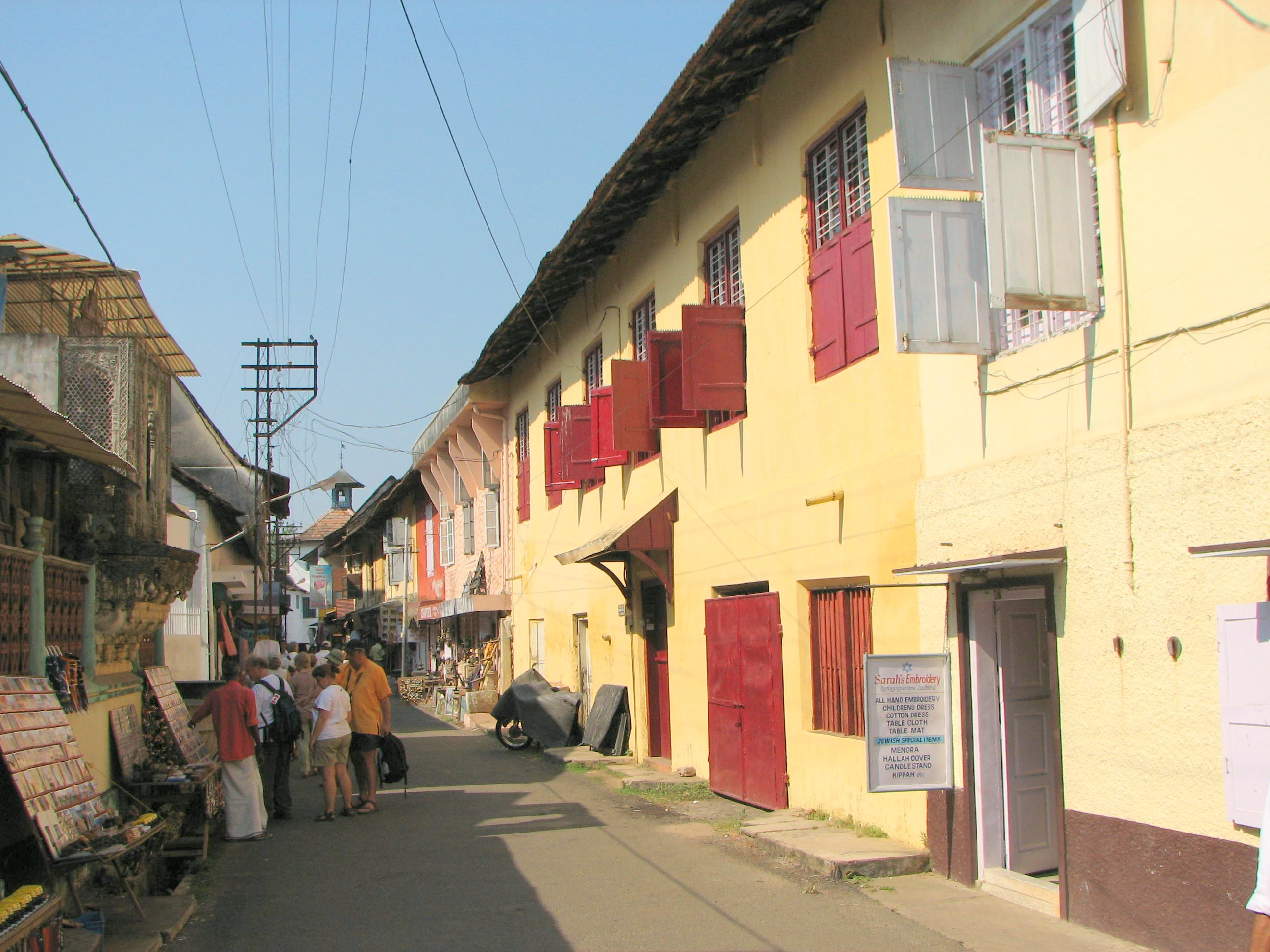
Jew Town, Fort Kochi

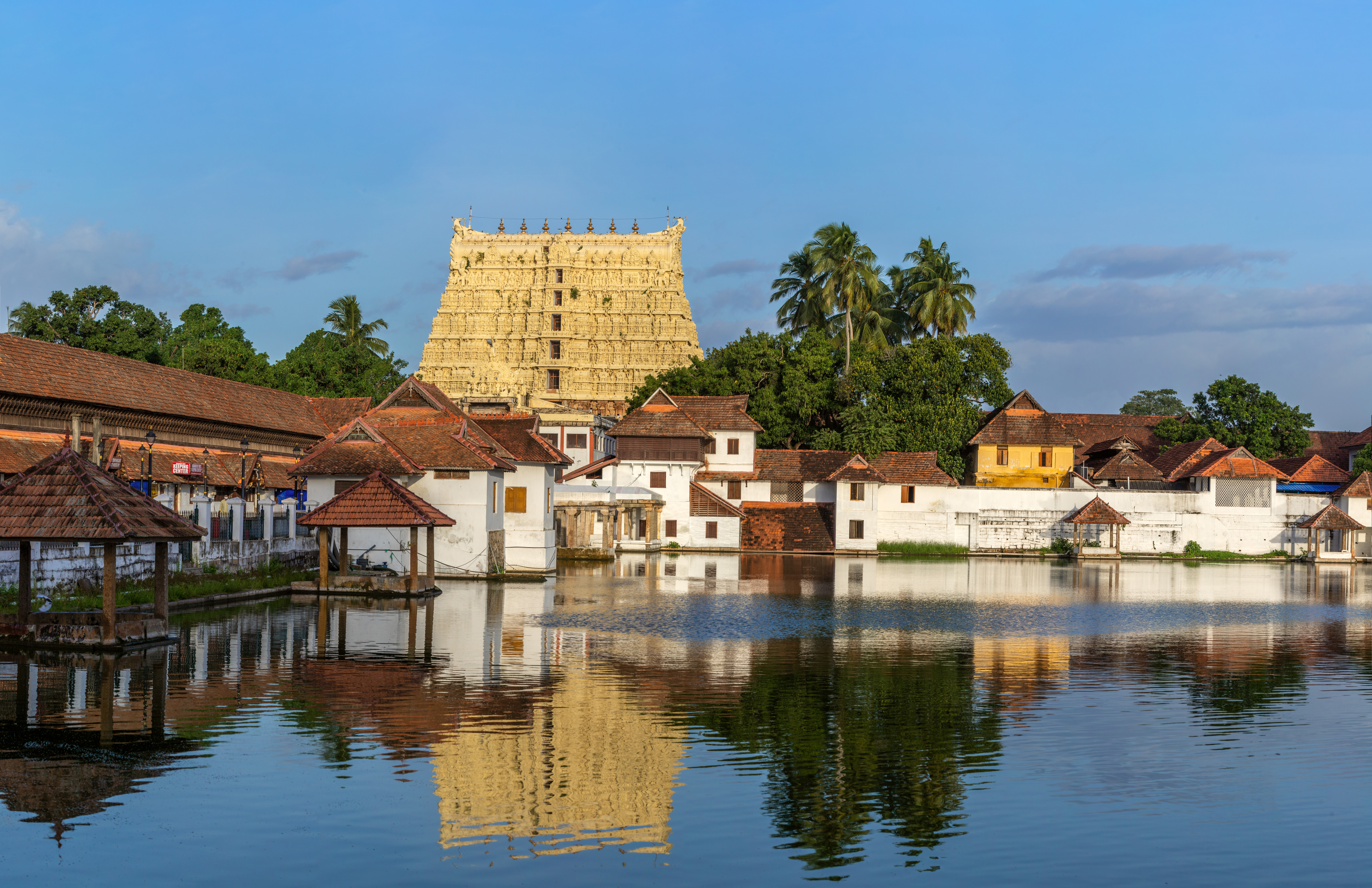
Padmanabhaswamy Temple, Thiruvanthapuram

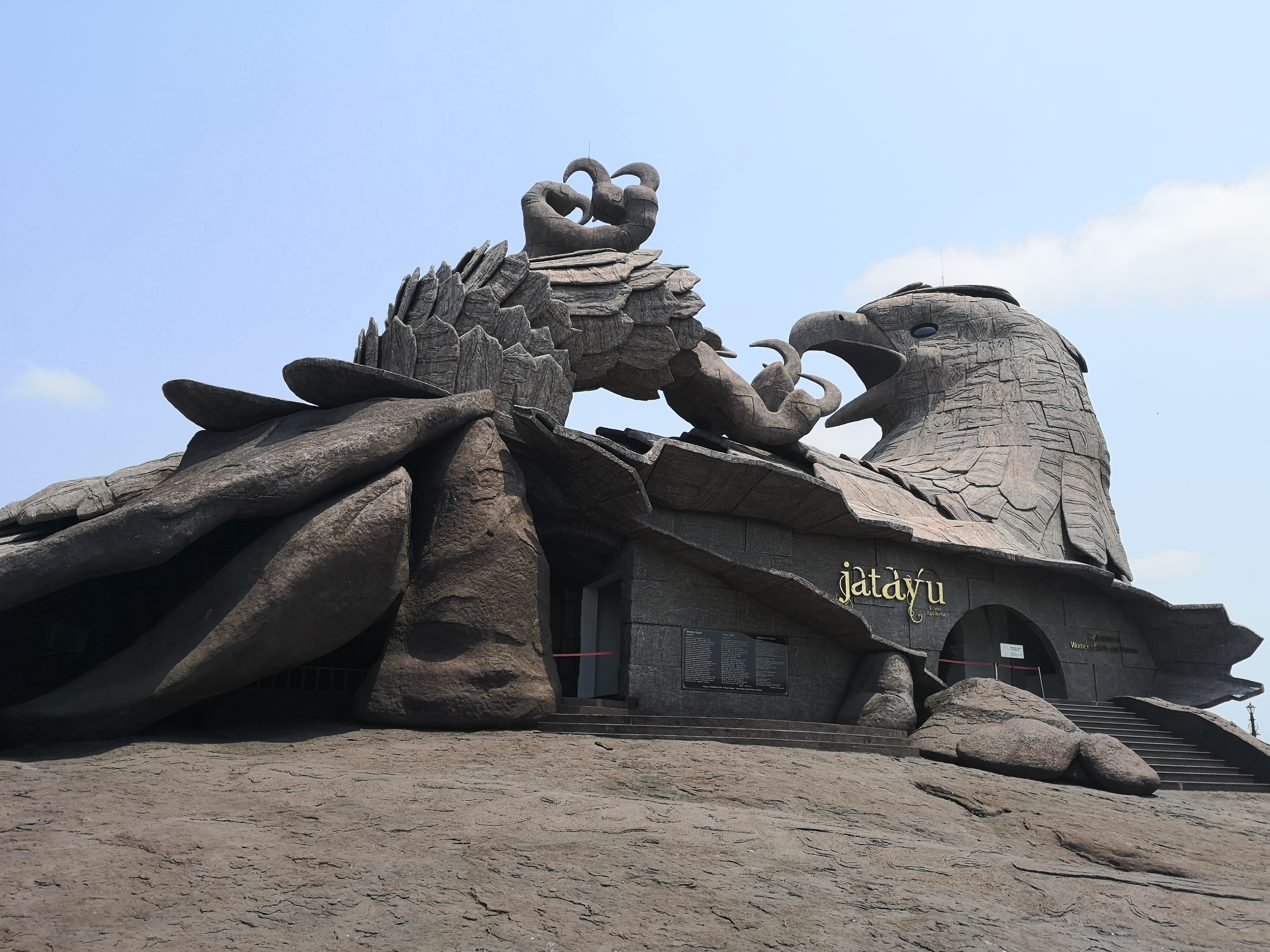
Jatayu Earth's Center Nature Park

Until the early 1980s, Kerala was a relatively unknown destination, with most tourism circuits concentrated around the north of the country. Aggressive marketing campaigns launched by the Kerala Tourism Development Corporation—the government agency that oversees tourism prospects of the state—laid the foundation for the growth of the tourism industry. In the decades that followed, Kerala Tourism was able to transform itself into one of the niche holiday destinations in India. The tag line Kerala – God's Own Country was adopted in its tourism promotions and became a global superbrand. Kerala is regarded as one of the destinations with the highest brand recall. In 2010, Kerala attracted 660,000 foreign tourist arrivals.

Kerala is a popular destination for both domestic as well as foreign tourists. Kerala is well known for its beaches, backwaters in Alappuzha and Kollam, mountain ranges and wildlife sanctuaries. Other popular attractions in the state include the beaches at Kovalam, Muzhappilangad, Bekal and Kappad; backwater tourism and lake resorts around Ashtamudi Lake, Kollam; hill stations and resorts at Munnar, Wayanad, Nelliampathi, Vagamon and Ponmudi; and national parks and wildlife sanctuaries at Wayanad, Periyar, Parambikulam, Silent Valley National Park and Eravikulam National Park. The "backwaters" region—an extensive network of interlocking rivers, lakes, and canals that centre on Vembanad Lake, also see heavy tourist traffic. Heritage sites, such as the Padmanabhapuram Palace, Hill Palace, and Mattancherry Palace, are also visited. To further promote tourism in Kerala, the Grand Kerala Shopping Festival was started by the Government of Kerala in 2007. Since then it has been held every year during the December–January period.

The state's tourism agenda promotes ecologically sustained tourism, which focuses on the local culture, wilderness adventures, volunteering and personal growth of the local population. Efforts are taken to minimize the adverse effects of traditional tourism on the natural environment and enhance the cultural integrity of local people. The state has also made deep inroads into MICE Tourism mainly centered at Kochi.

== Historical context ==
Since its incorporation as a state, Kerala's economy largely operated under welfare-based democratic socialist principles. This mode of development, though it resulted in a high Human Development Index and standard of living among the people, led to an economic stagnation in the 1980s (growth rate are 2.3% annually). This apparent paradox—high human development and low economic development—led to a large number of educated unemployed seeking jobs overseas, especially in the Gulf countries. Due to a large number of expatriates, many travel operators and agencies set up shop in the state to facilitate their travel needs. However, the trends soon reciprocated, with the travel agencies noticing the unrealised potential of the state as a tourist destination. The first travel agency in Kerala, Kerala Travels, was founded by Col G.V. Raja of the Travancore royal family along with P.G.C. Pillai.

Number of tourists by nationality
No.	Country	Tourists
1	United Kingdom	186,085
2	United States	109,859
3	France	97,894
4	Germany	67,425
5	Saudi Arabia	58,422
6	Maldives	52,236
7	Australia	42,089
8	Malaysia	40,197
9	Oman	38,619
10	Russia	35,066
As of 2019

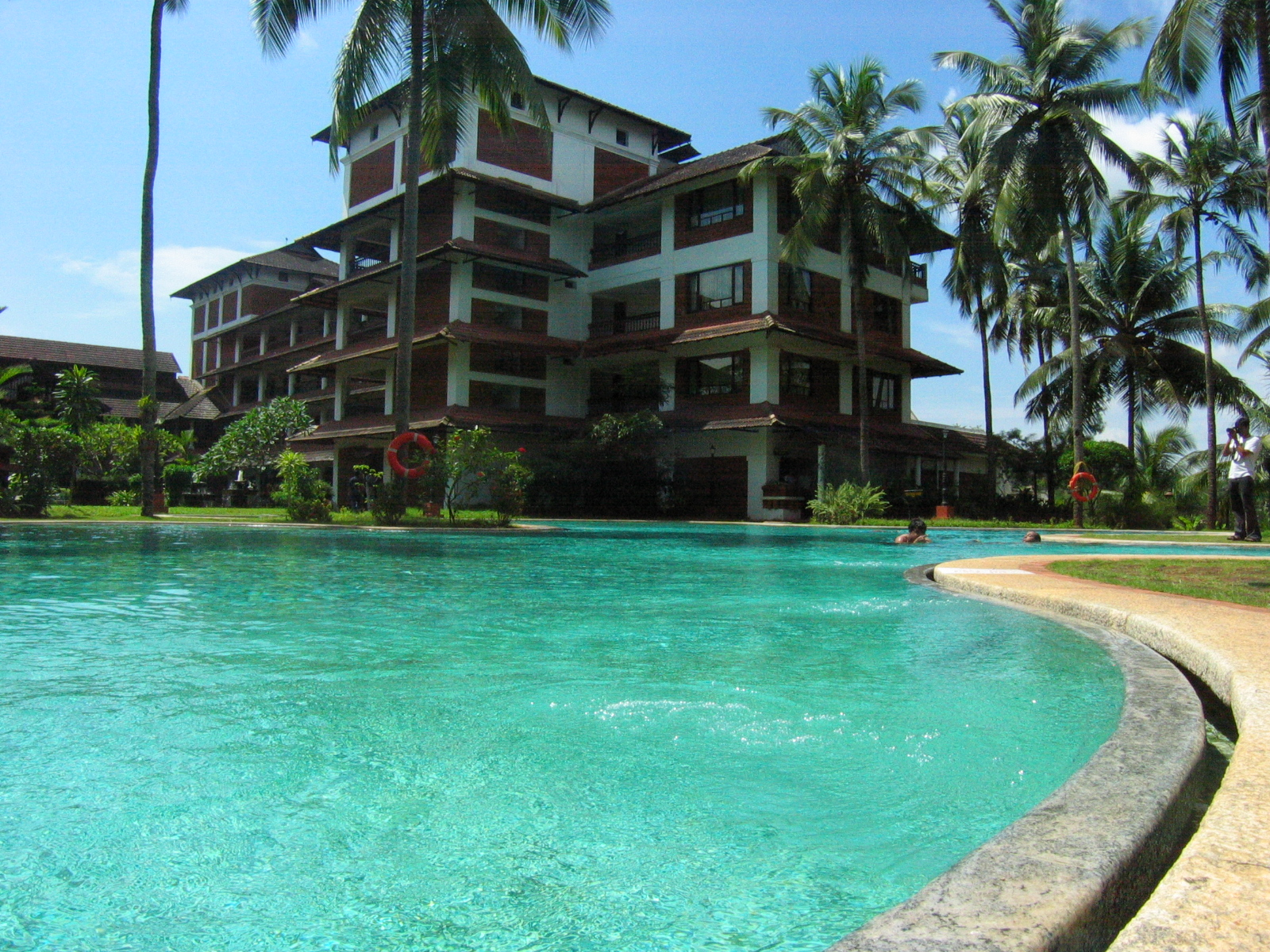
Resorts dot the lengths and breadths of Kerala.

By 1986, tourism had gained an industry status. Kerala Tourism subsequently adopted the tagline God's Own Country in its advertisement campaigns. Aggressive promotion in print and electronic media was able to invite a sizable investment in the hospitality industry. By the early 2000s, tourism had grown into a full-fledged, multi-billion-dollar industry in the state. The state was able to carve a niche for itself in the world tourism industry, thus becoming one of the places with the "highest brand recall". In 2003, Kerala, became one of the fastest-growing tourism destination in the world.

In 2012, National Geographic's Traveller magazine named Kerala as one of the "ten paradises of the world" and "50 must see destinations of a lifetime". Travel and Leisure also described Kerala as "One of the 100 great trips for the 21st century". In 2012, Kerala overtook the Taj Mahal to be the number one travel destination in Google's search trends for India. CNN Travel listed Kerala amongst its '19 best places to visit in 2019. Time magazine picked Kerala among 50 ‘extraordinary destinations’ across the globe to explore in 2022. The state was ranked ninth in the ‘World's Greatest Places' and was described as an ‘eco-tourism hot spot'. In 2023, The New York Times selected Kerala as one of the 52 must-see tourism destinations in the world. Kerala was selected as thirteenth in the list and was the only state in the list from India.

Arrivals of number of tourist between 2012 and 2022
Year	Total Tourists Arrived	Domestic		International	
Year	Total Tourists Arrived	Total Visitors	% of Change	Total Visitors	% of Change
2023	21,871,641	21,222,584	▲12.48%	649,057	▲87.83%
2022	19,212,963	18,867,414	▲150.31%	345,549	▲471.28%
2021	7,598,104	7,537,617	▲51.09%	60,487	▼82.25%
2020	5,329,727	4,988,972	▼72.86%	340,755	▼71.36%
2019	19,574,004	18,384,233	▲17.81%	1,189,771	▲8.52%
2018	16,701,068	15,604,661	▲6.35%	1,096,407	▲0.42%
2017	15,765,390	14,673,520	▲11.39%	1,091,870	▲5.15%
2016	14,210,954	13,172,535	▲5.67%	1,038,419	▲6.23%
2015	13,443,050	12,465,571	▲6.59%	977,479	▲5.86%
2014	12,618,777	11,695,411	▲7.71%	923,366	▲7.60%
2013	11,445,954	10,857,811	▲7.75%	858,143	▲8.12%
2012	10,870,550	10,076,854	▲7.41%	793,696	▲8.28%
As of 2022

== Major attractions ==
=== Beaches ===
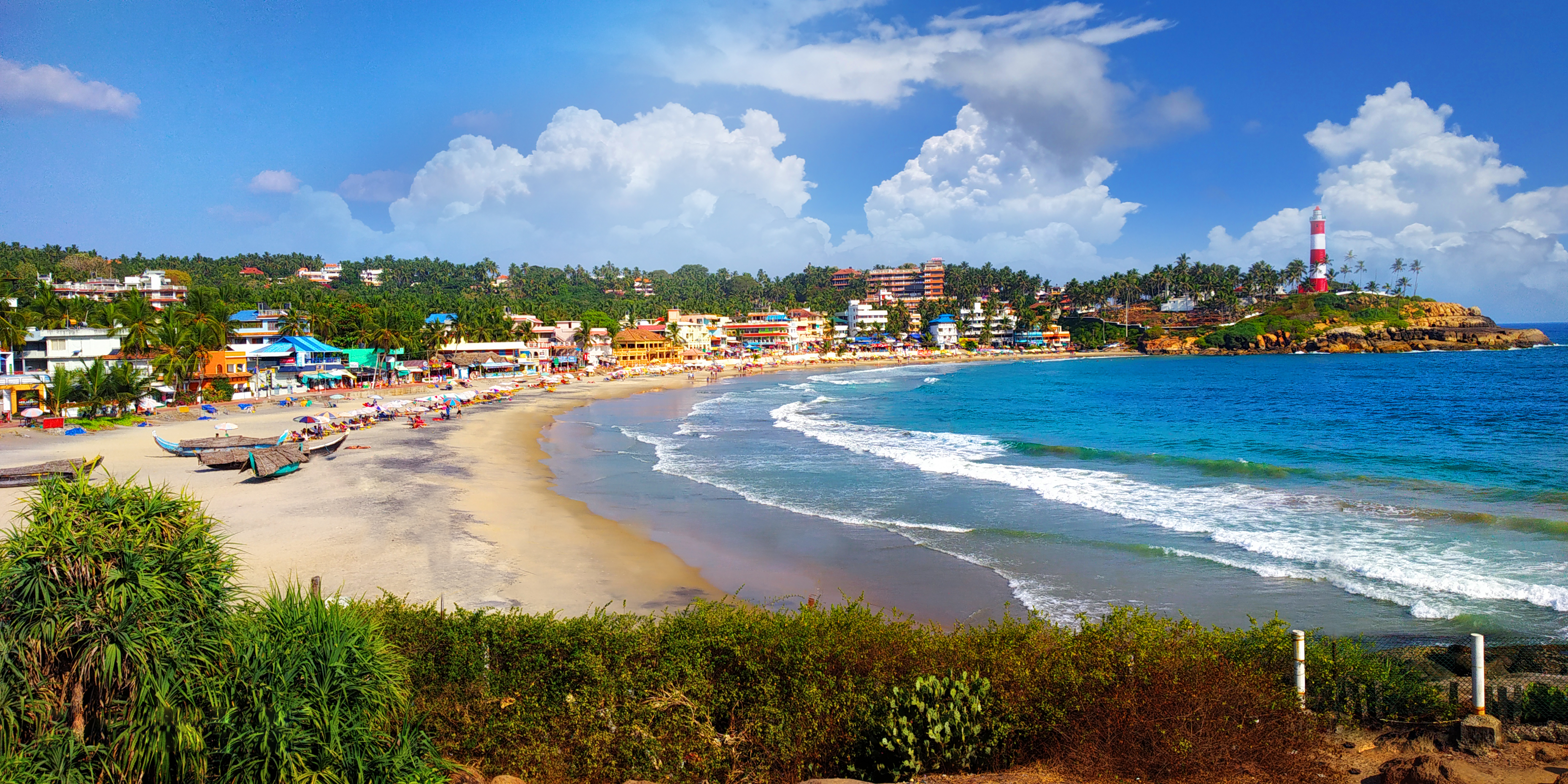
Kovalam beach

Flanked on the western coast by the Arabian Sea, Kerala one of the long coastline of 580 km (360 mi); all of which is virtually dotted with sandy beaches. Kovalam beach near Thiruvananthapuram was among the first beaches in Kerala to attract tourists. Rediscovered by back-packers and tan-seekers in the 1960s and followed by hordes of hippies in the 1970s, Kovalam today is one of the most visited beaches in the state.

Other popularly visited beaches in the state include those at Kappad, Alappuzha, Kozhikode Beach, Marari Beach (Mararikulam, Alappuzha), Thumpoly (thumpoly beach ) Alappuzha,Alappuzha , Nattika (Thrissur), Vadanappilly beach (Thrissur), Cherai Beach, Ponnani beach, Bekal, Kappad Beypore beach, Marari beach, Fort Kochi, Azheekal Beach and Varkala. The Muzhappilangad Beach at Kannur and Thikkodi Beach at Kozhikode are the only two drive-in beach in India. Marari beach was rated as one of the world's top five Hammock Beaches by the National Geographic survey and has been cited in the international press.

=== Backwaters ===
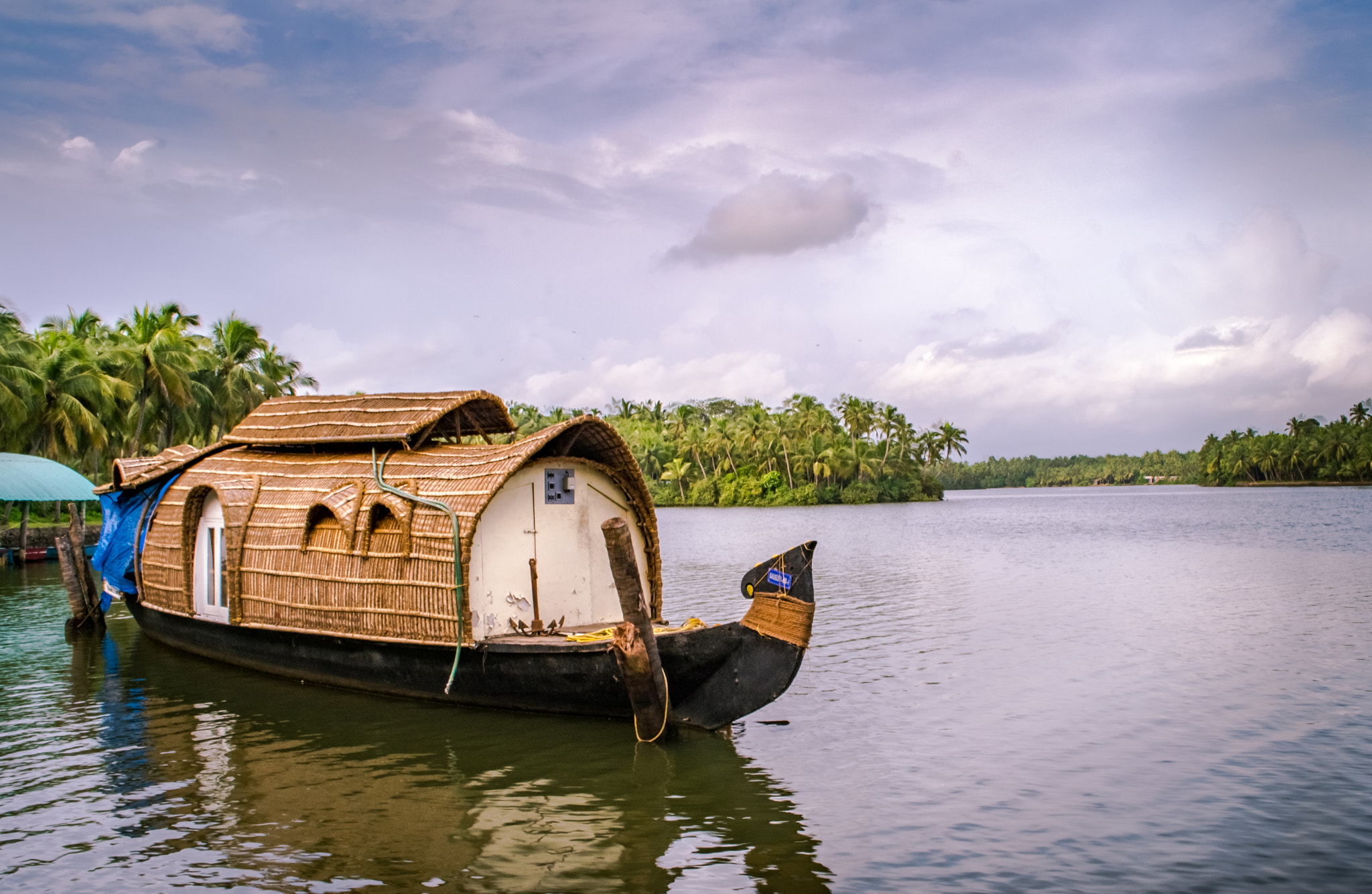
Boating at Biyyam Lake near Ponnani

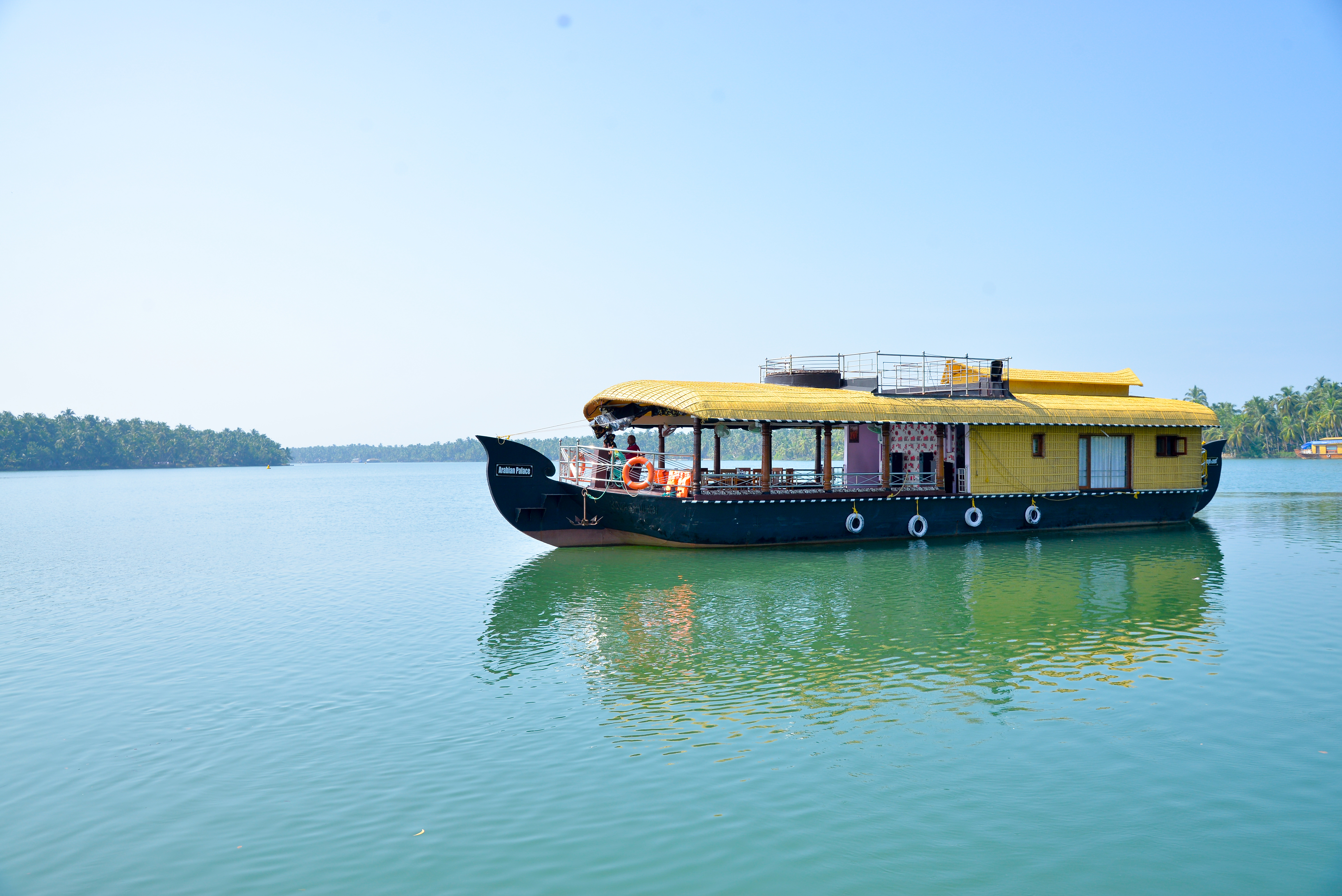
A Kettuvallam at Kavvayi Backwaters, Nileshwaram

The backwaters in Kerala are a chain of brackish lagoons and lakes lying parallel to the Arabian Sea coast (known as the Malabar Coast). Houseboat or Kettuvallam rides in backwaters are a major tourist attraction in kerala. Backwater tourism is centered mostly around of Kerala like Alleppey, Kumarakom, Ashtamudi Lake, Kollam, Ponnani, Kavvayi Backwaters, Vembanad and Bekal. Boat races held during festival seasons are also a major tourist attraction in the backwater regions.

The backwater network includes large lakes such as the Ashtamudi Lake, the largest among them, linked by 1500 km of canals, both man-made and natural and fed by several rivers, and extending virtually the entire length of Kerala state. The backwaters were formed by the action of waves and shore currents creating low barrier islands across the mouths of the many rivers flowing down from the Western Ghats range.

=== Hill stations ===
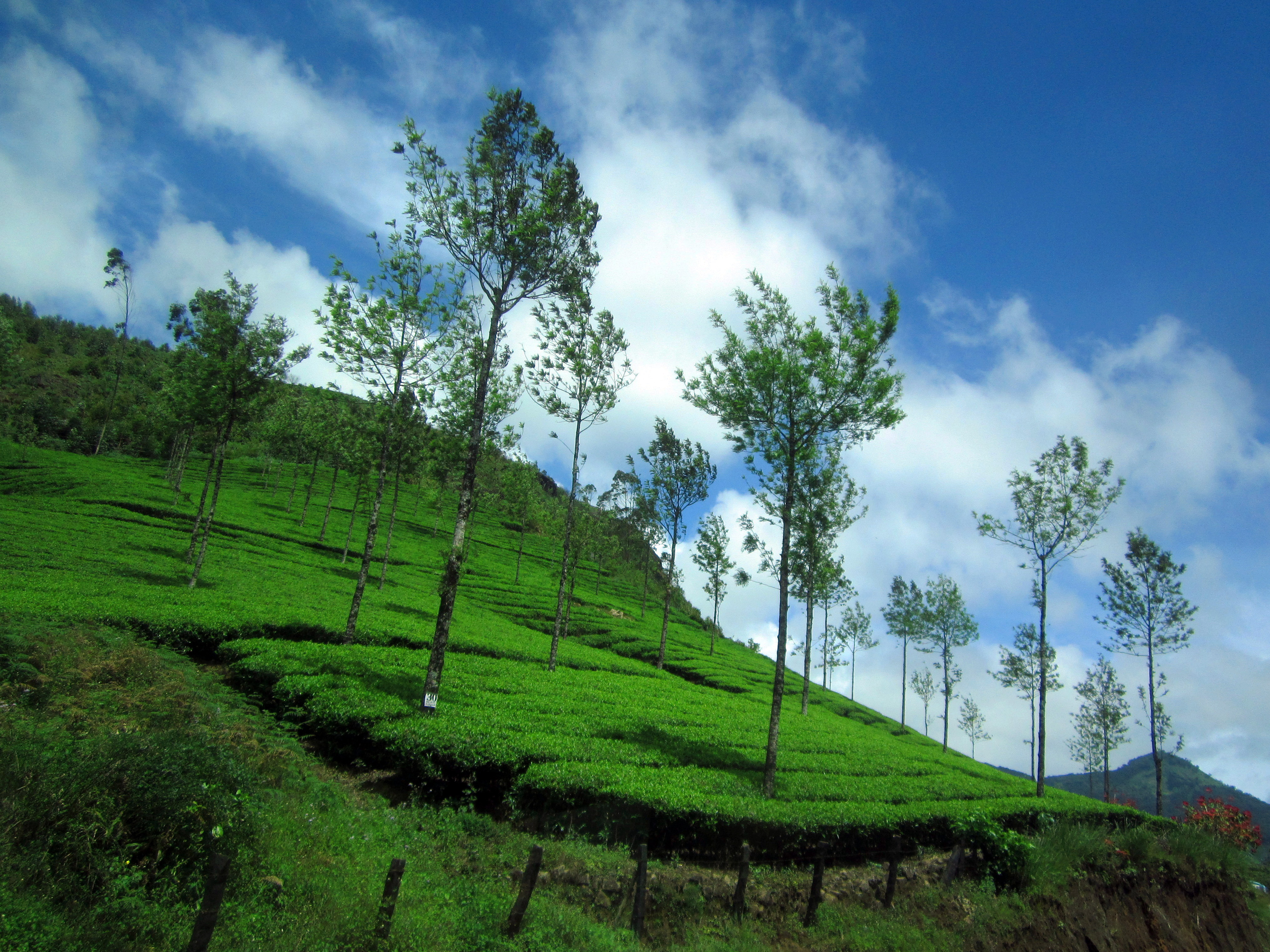
Munnar Hillscape

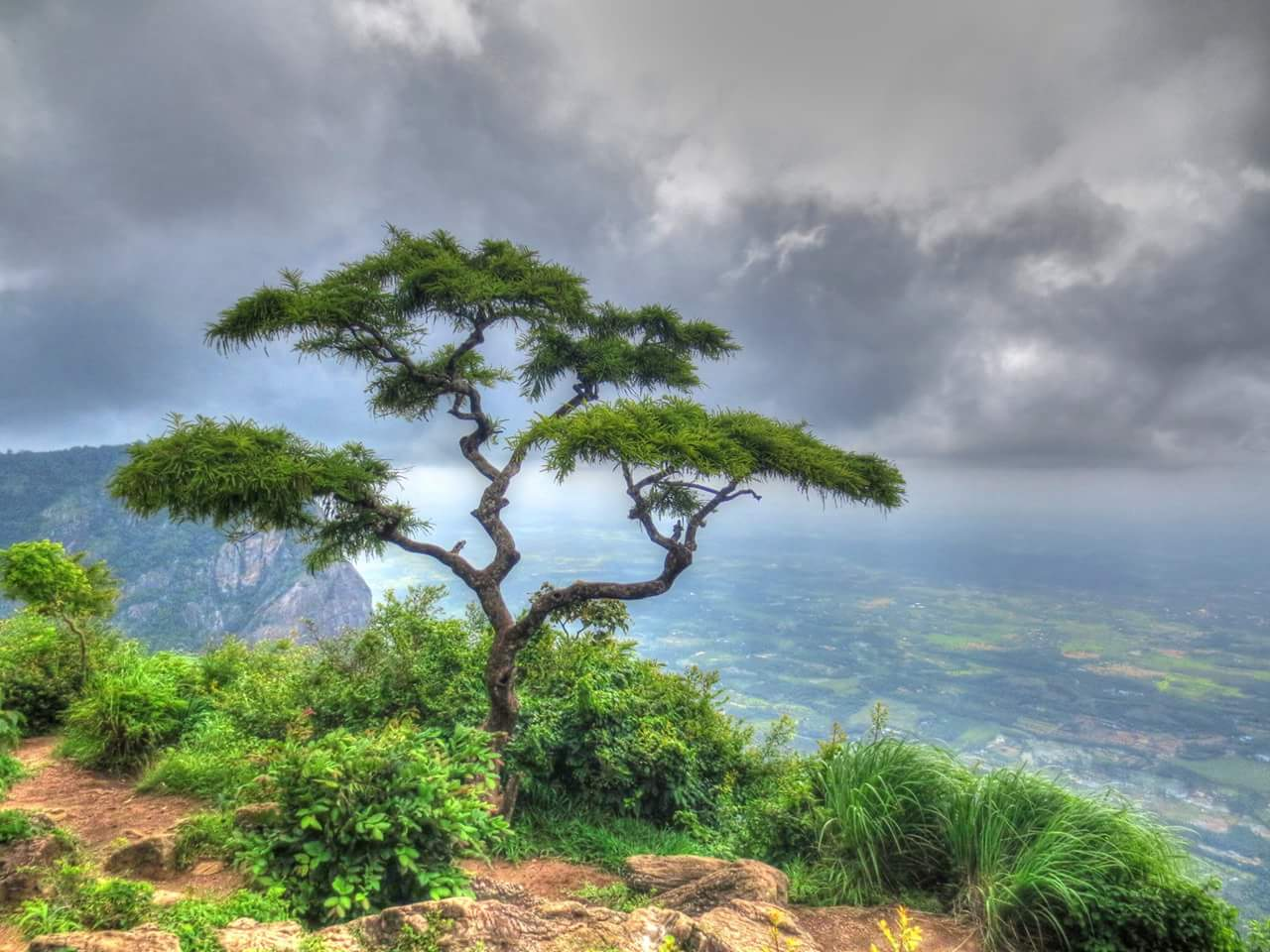
Sithar Kundu View Point at Nelliyampathy, Palakkad Dist. Kerala, South India

Eastern Kerala consists of land encroached upon by the Western Ghats; the region thus includes high mountains, gorges, and deep-cut valleys. The Western Ghats is a UNESCO World Heritage Site and is one of the 36 biodiversity hotspots in the world. The wildest lands are covered with dense forests, while other regions lie under tea and coffee plantations (established mainly in the 19th and 20th centuries) or other forms of cultivation.

The Western Ghats rise an average to 1500 m elevation above sea level. Some of the popular hill stations in the region are Munnar, Vagamon, Paithalmala, Wayanad, Nelliyampathi, Nilambur, Elapeedika, Peermade, Thekkady, Ponmudi and Kalvary Mount.

=== Wildlife ===
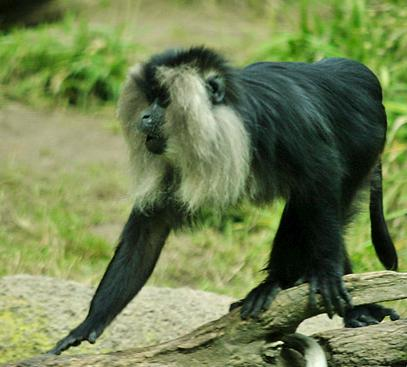
Silent Valley National Park in Palakkad is home to the largest population of lion-tailed macaque. They are among the world's rarest and most threatened primates.

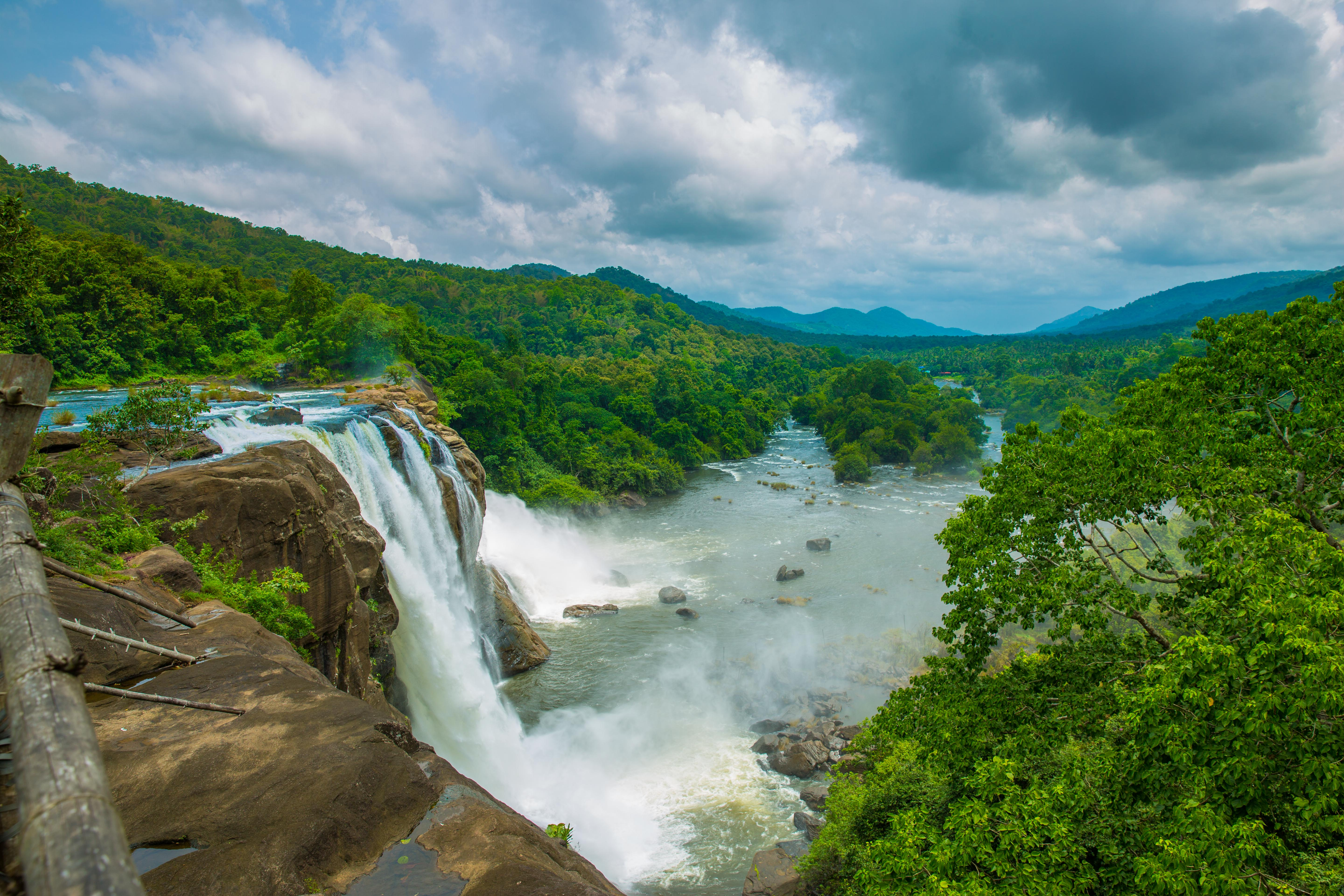
Athirappilly Falls at Thrissur. Wildlife of Kerala is mainly concentrated in the forests of Western Ghats

Most of Kerala, whose native habitat consists of wet evergreen rainforests at lower elevations and highland deciduous and semi-evergreen forests in the east, is subject to a humid tropical climate. However, significant variations in terrain and elevation have resulted in a land whose biodiversity registers as among the world's most significant. Most of Kerala's significantly biodiverse tracts of wilderness lie in the evergreen forests of its easternmost districts. Kerala also hosts two of the world's Ramsar Convention-listed wetlands: Lake Sasthamkotta and the Vembanad-Kol wetlands are noted as being wetlands of international importance. There are also numerous protected conservation areas, including 1455.4 km^{2} of the vast Nilgiri Biosphere Reserve. In turn, the forests play host to such major fauna as Asian elephant (Elephas maximus), Bengal tiger (Panthera tigris tigris), leopard (Panthera pardus), Nilgiri tahr (Nilgiritragus hylocrius), and grizzled giant squirrel (Ratufa macroura). More remote preserves, including Silent Valley National Park in the Kundali Hills, harbour endangered species such as the lion-tailed macaque (Macaca silenus), Indian sloth bear (Melursus (Ursus) ursinus ursinus), and gaur (the so-called "Indian bison"—Bos gaurus). More common species include Indian porcupine (Hystrix indica), chital (Axis axis), sambar (Cervus unicolor), gray langur, flying squirrel, swamp lynx (Felis chaus kutas), boar (Sus scrofa), a variety of catarrhine Old World monkey species, gray wolf (Canis lupus), and common palm civet (Paradoxurus hermaphroditus). Many reptiles, such as king cobra, viper, python, various turtles and crocodiles are to be found in Kerala—again, disproportionately in the east. Kerala's avifauna include endemics like the Sri Lanka frogmouth (Batrachostomus moniliger), Oriental bay owl, large frugivores like the great hornbill (Buceros bicornis) and Indian grey hornbill, as well as the more widespread birds such as peafowl, Indian cormorant, jungle and hill myna, Oriental darter, black-hooded oriole, greater racket-tailed and black drongoes, bulbul (Pycnonotidae), species of kingfisher and woodpecker, jungle fowl, Alexandrine parakeet, and assorted ducks and migratory birds. Additionally, freshwater fish such as kadu (stinging catfish—Heteropneustes fossilis) and brackishwater species such as Choottachi (orange chromide—Etroplus maculatus, valued as an aquarium specimen) also are native to Kerala's lakes and waterways.

=== Historical monuments ===
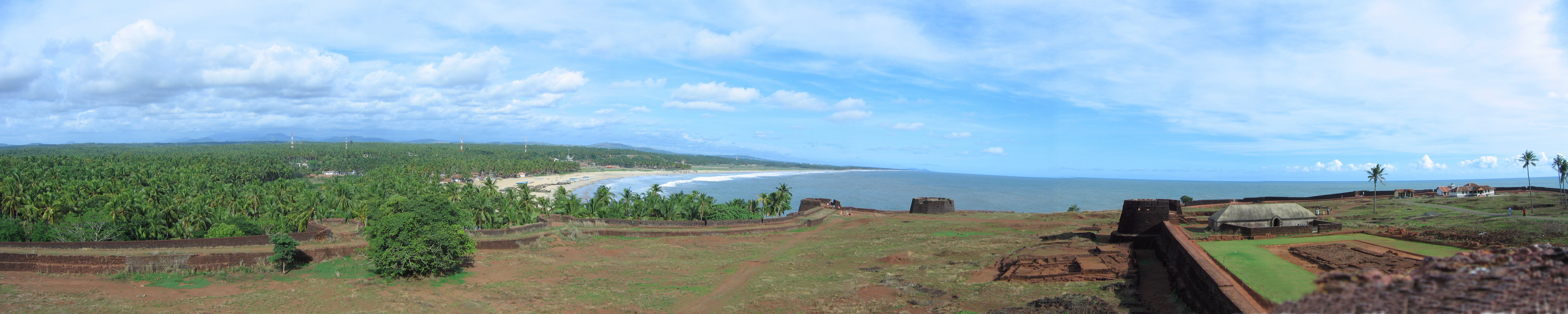
Panoramic view from inside Bekal Fort, the largest fort in Kerala

Historical monuments in Kerala include palaces, forts, and religious institutions. Notable forts include Bekal Fort, Arikady fort, Chandragiri fort, Hosdurg Fort, Palakkad Fort, Thalassery Fort, Fortaleza da São Tomé, Fort Kochi, St Thomas Fort, East Fort and Anchuthengu Fort. Notable palaces include Padmanabhapuram Palace, Kanakakkunnu Palace, Kowdiar Palace, Mattancherry Palace, Arakkal Palace, Shakthan Thampuran Palace, Hill Palace etc. The Malabar Coast is also home to some of the oldest temples, oldest mosques, oldest churches, and oldest synagogues in South Asia. The historic trading food streets in Kerala include the S. M. Street (Sweetmeat street) at Kozhikode. Mappila Bay harbour at Kannur is home to both fort and palace. Thalassery Cuisine, a traditional style of cuisine originated in Northern Kerala due to its historical trade relations, also attracts tourists.

== Events ==
=== Festivals ===
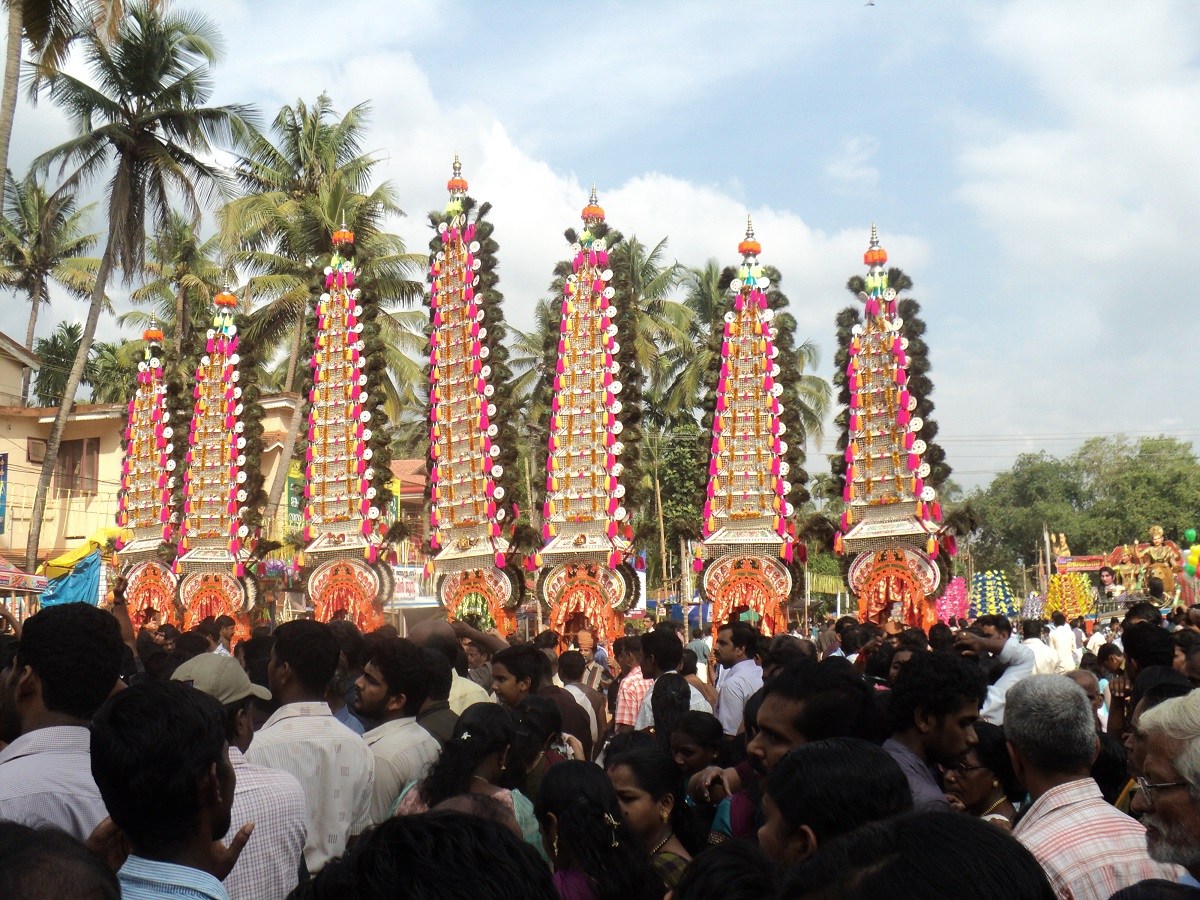
Shashti Thrissur Pooram

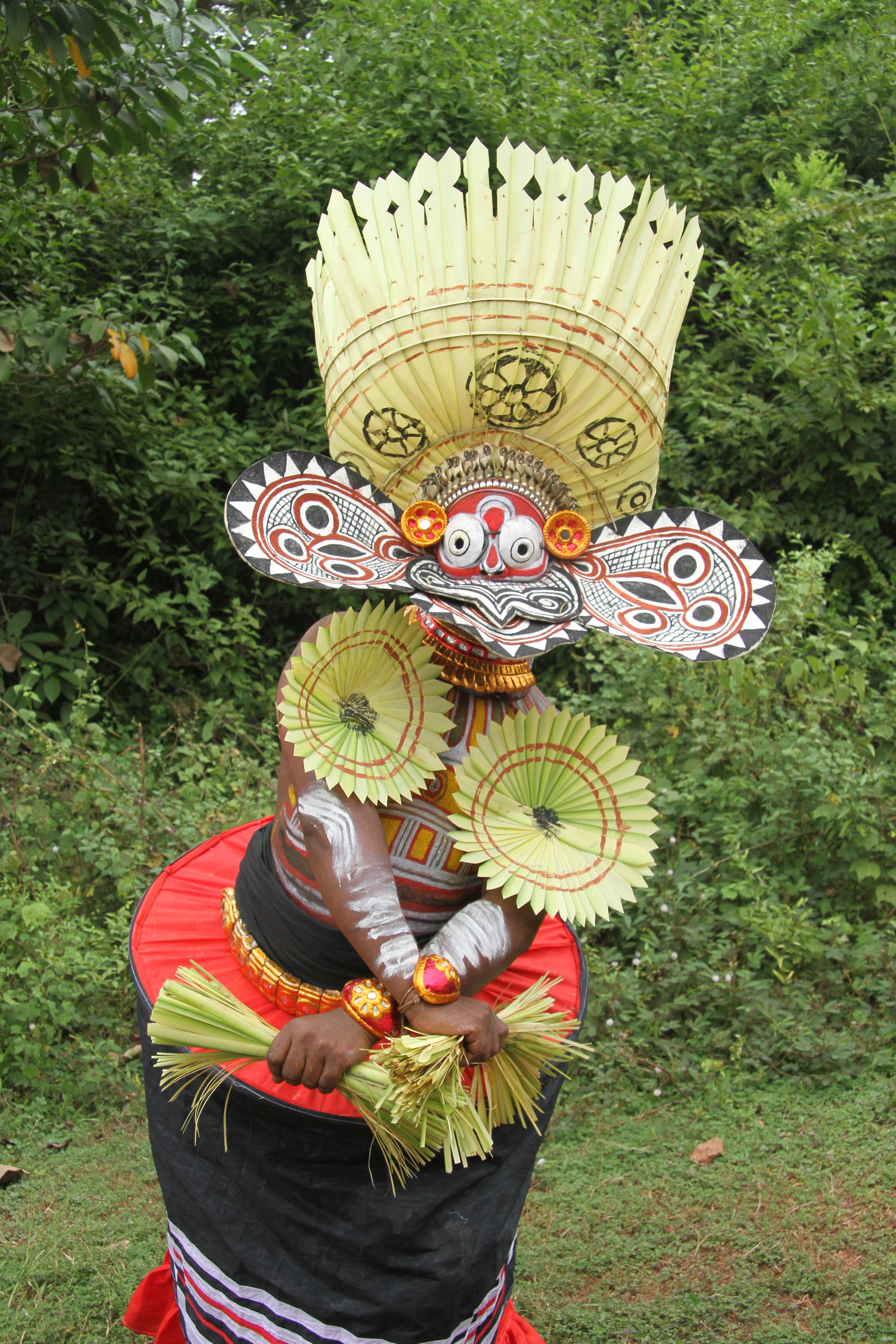
Thirayattam (kuttychathan) an ethnic ritual performing art form in Kerala State, India

The major festival in Kerala is Onam. Kerala has also a number of religious festivals. Thrissur Pooram, Attukal Pongala, Beema Palli Uroos, and Chettikulangara Bharani are the major temple festivals in Kerala. The Thrissur Pooram is conducted at the Vadakumnathan temple, Thrissur. The Sivarathri is also an important festival in Kerala. Aluva Sivarathri festival is the most famous festival related to Sivaratri. Festivals like Christmas and Easter are observed by the Christians. Parumala Perunnal, Manarkadu, Arthunkal, Thumpoly, Edathua Perunnal are the other regional festivals of Christians. Eid al-Fitr and Eid al-Adha are celebrated by the Muslim community. The annual festival Thirayattam is conducted in the village shrine of the south Malabar region in Kerala.

=== Kochi-Muziris Biennale ===
Kochi-Muziris Biennale is the largest art exhibition in the country and the biggest contemporary art festival in Asia conducted every year in the city of Kochi. The first Biennale in India was conducted in Kochi from 12 December 2012 till 13 March 2013.

The Wayanad Literature Festival is India's largest rurally held literature festival. It's a biennale, and takes place every even year. Speakers from across the country come to speak about literature, politics and media. Notable speakers from the last edition include, Prakash Raj, Parvathy Thiruvothu, Sheela Tomy, Dhanya Rajendran, amongst others.

== Medical tourism ==
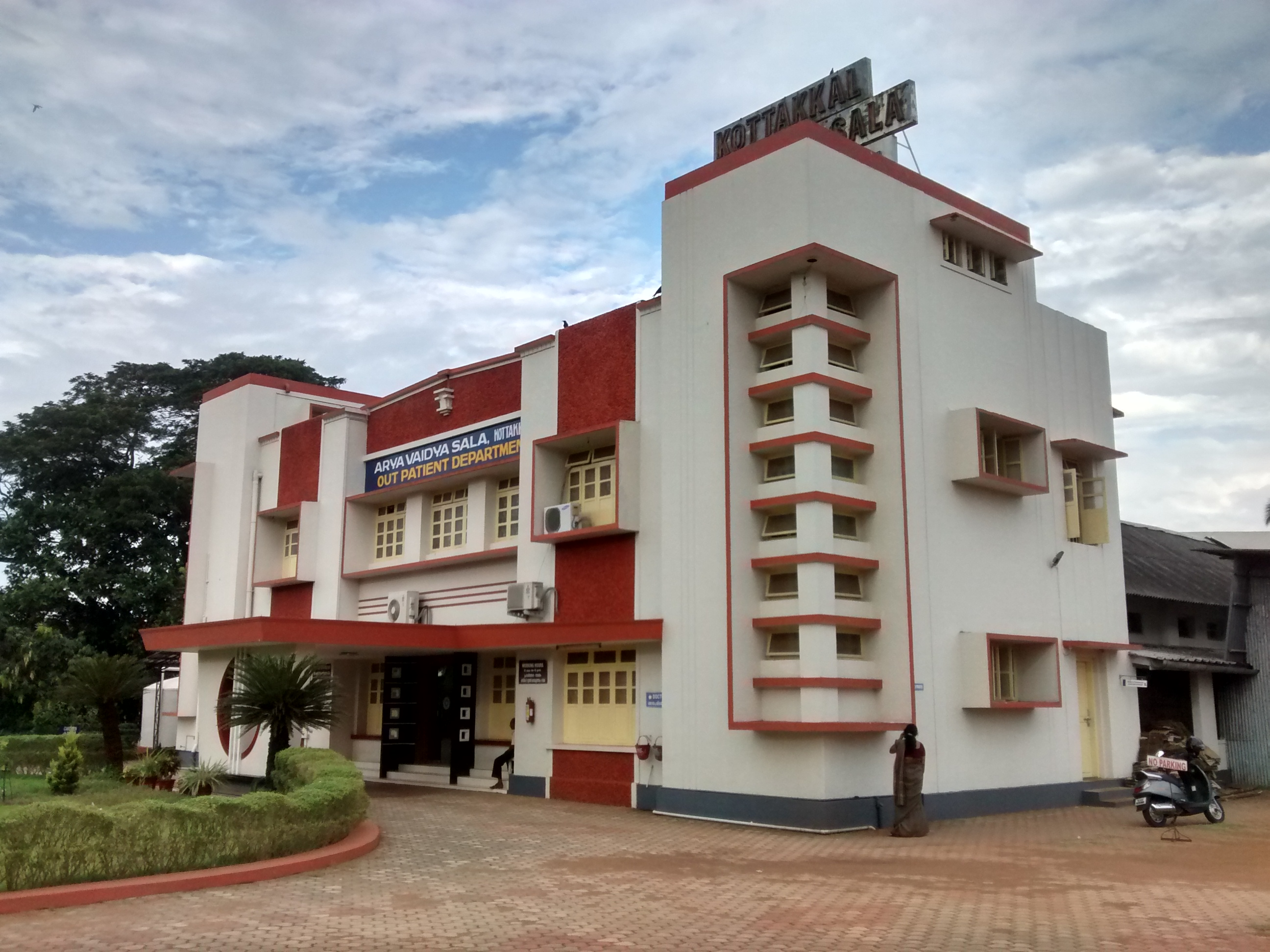
Arya Vaidya Sala, Kottakkal

Medical tourism, promoted by traditional systems of medicine like Ayurveda and Siddha, is widely popular in the state, and draws increasing numbers of tourists. Kerala is popularly known as hub of Ayurveda. The medical tourism segment of Kerala is known for its reputation.

== Culture ==
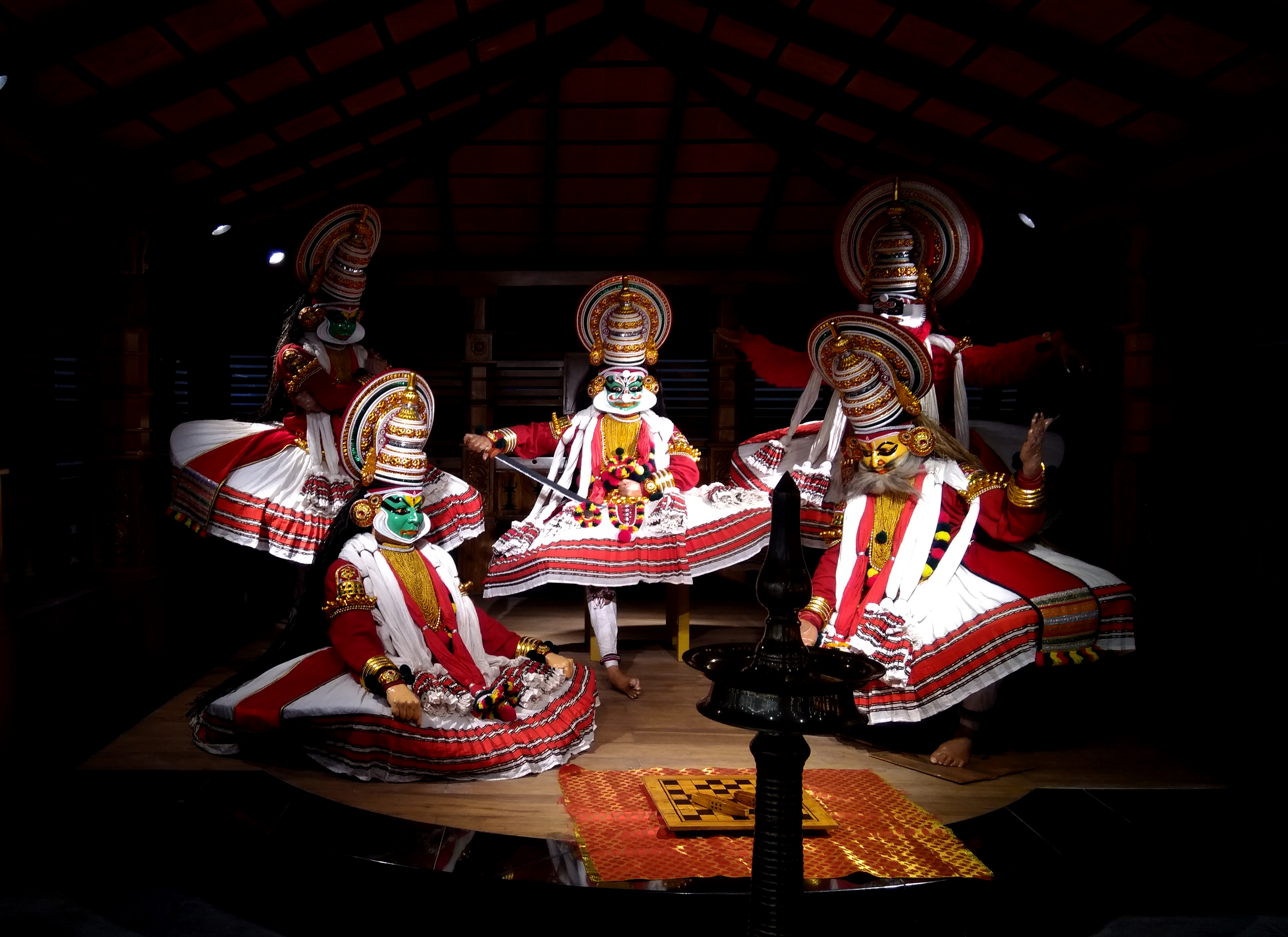
Kathakali is one of a major form of classical Indian dance

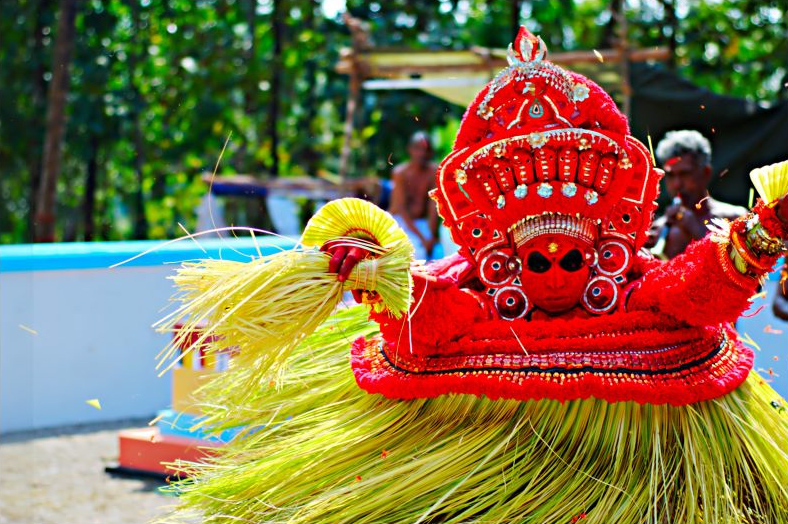
Vishnu Moorthy Theyyam in Naduvilathu Kottam near Payyannur, Kannur.

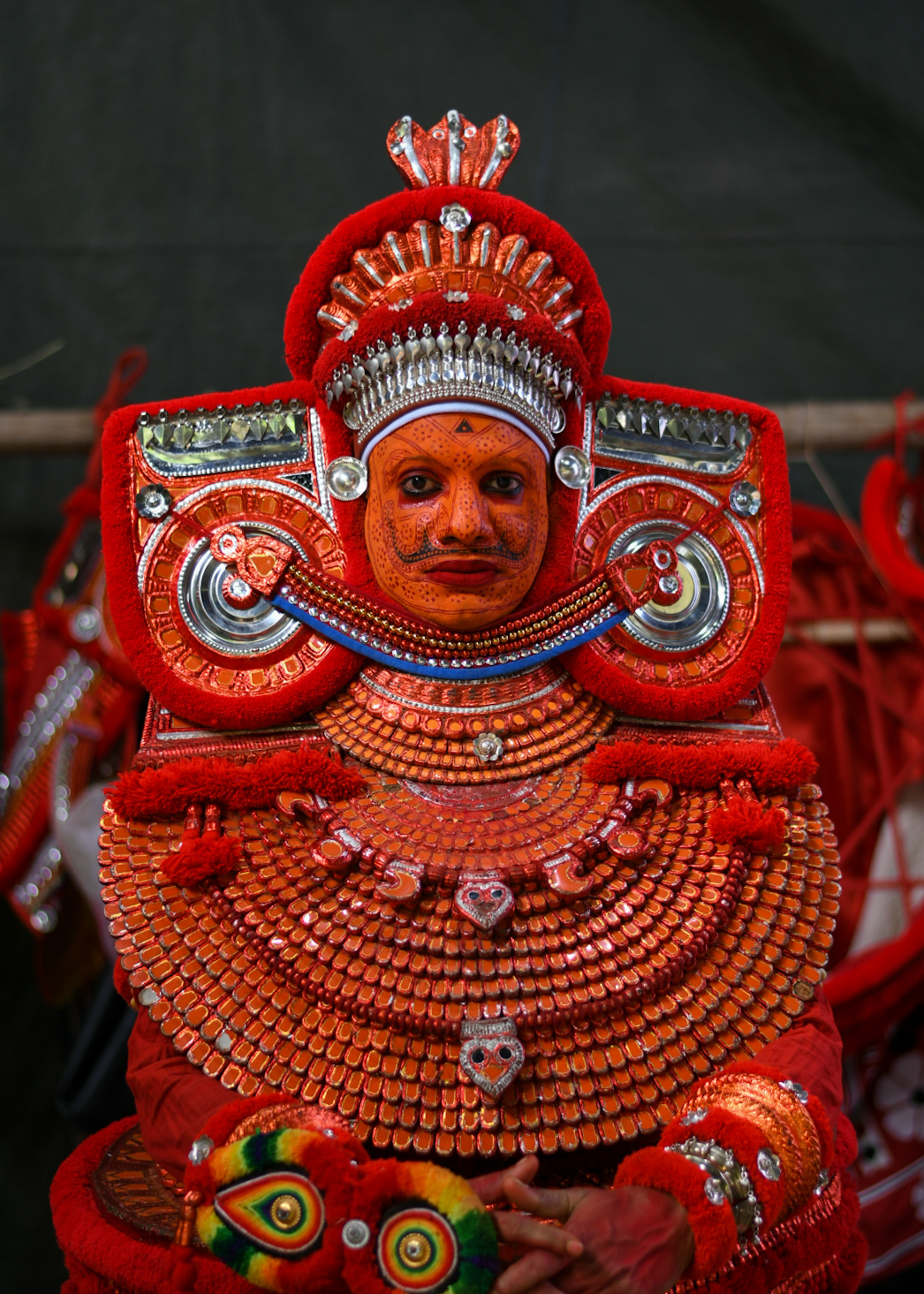
Theyyam is a Hindu religious ritual practiced in northern Kerala

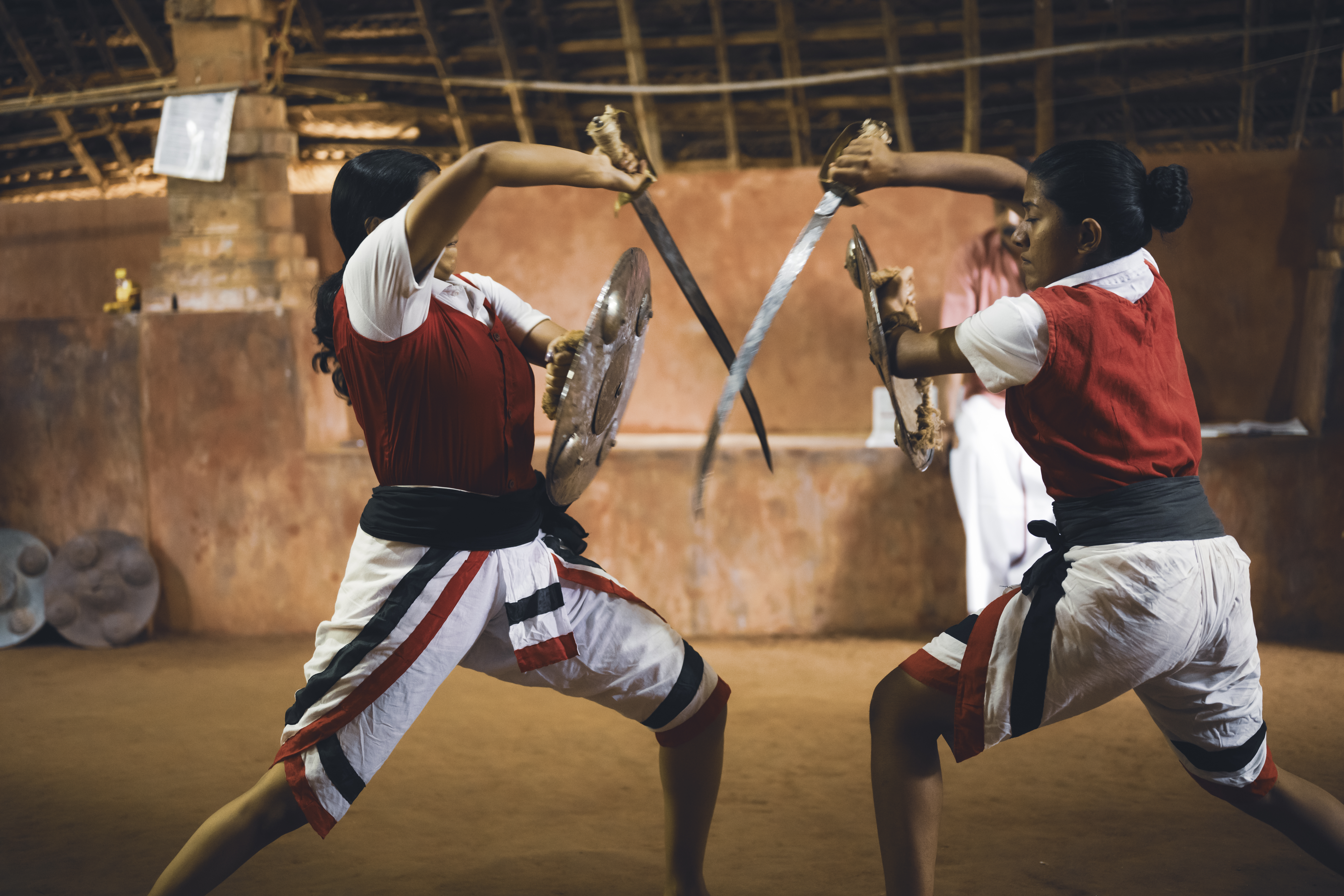
Kalaripayattu is an Indian martial art that originated in Kerala

Kerala's culture is mainly Hindu in origin, deriving from a greater Tamil-heritage region known as Tamilakam. Later, Kerala's culture was elaborated on through centuries of contact with overseas cultures. Native performing arts include koodiyattom, kathakali—from katha ("story") and kali ("play")—and its offshoot Kerala Natanam, koothu (akin to stand-up comedy), mohiniaattam ("dance of the enchantress"), thullal, padayani, thirayattam, and theyyam. Other arts are more religion- and tribal-themed. These include chavittu nadakom, oppana (originally from Malabar), which combines dance, rhythmic hand clapping, and ishal vocalisations. However, many of these art forms largely play to tourists or at youth festivals, and are not as popular among most ordinary Keralites, who look to more contemporary art.

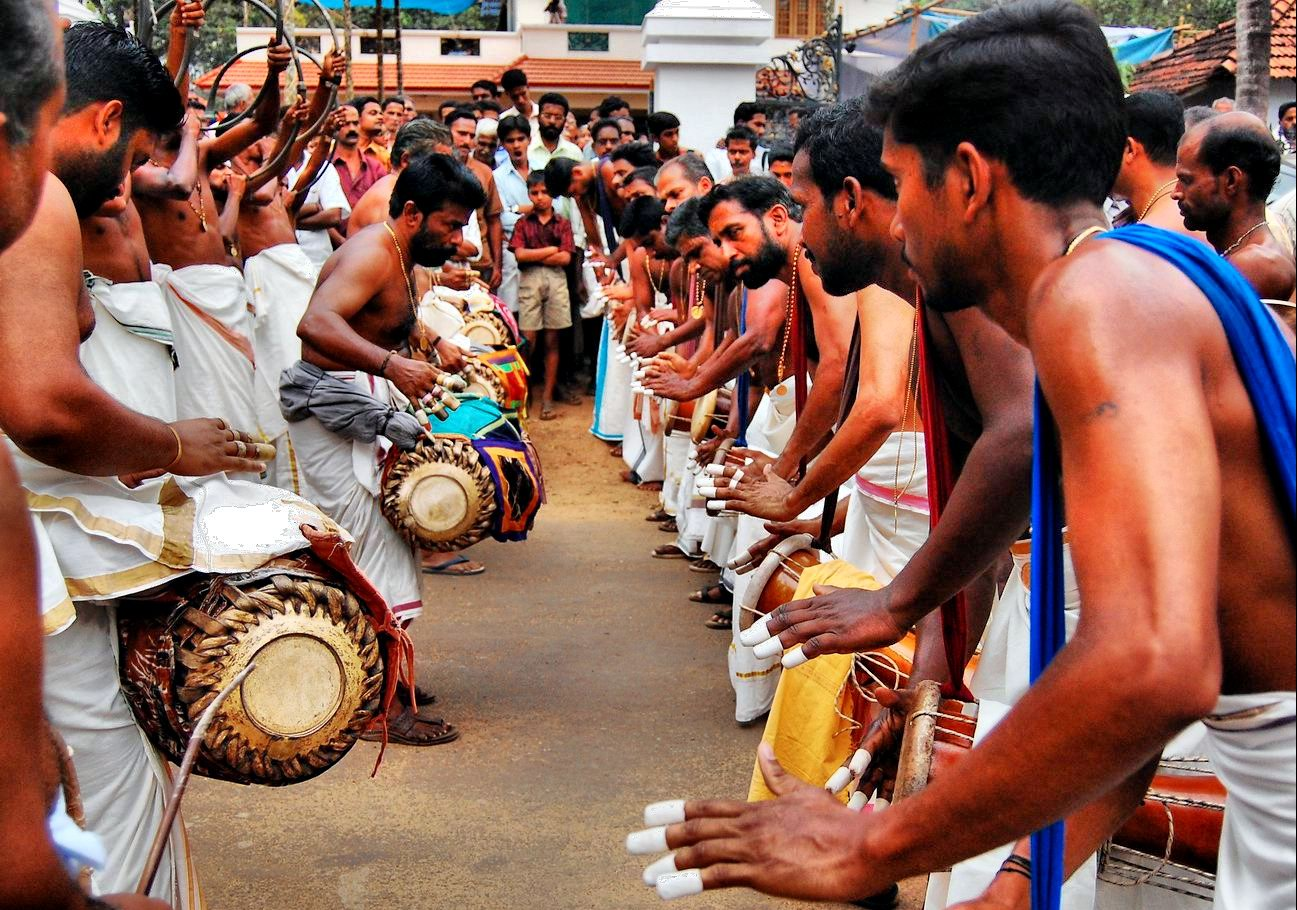
Panchavadyam

Several ancient ritualised arts are Keralite in origin; these include kalaripayattu (kalari ("place", "threshing floor", or "battlefield") and payattu ("exercise" or "practice")). Among the world's oldest martial arts, oral tradition attributes kalaripayattu's emergence to Parasurama. Other ritual arts include Thirayattam, theyyam, poorakkali and Kuthiyottam. Thirayattam is a ritual performing folk art form of South Malabar region. Processions often include traditional music such as Panchari melam or Panchavadyam.

In respect of Fine Arts, the state has an abounding tradition of both ancient and contemporary art and artists. The traditional Kerala murals are found in ancient temples, churches and palaces across the State. These paintings, mostly dating to between the 9th to 12th centuries AD, display a distinct style, and a colour code which is predominantly ochre and green.

Kerala is known for its religious diversity. The major religions are Hinduism, Christianity and Islam. Jainism, Judaism, Sikhism and Buddhism have smaller followings. The state's historic ties with the rest of the world have resulted in the state having many notable temples, churches and mosques. Kerala is home to the Kottakkavu church, one of the first churches in India founded by Thomas the Apostle when he reached Indian shores, Cheraman Mosque, the first mosque in India, which is considered to have existed even before the death of the Muhammad and Paradesi Synagogue, which is the oldest active synagogue in the Commonwealth of Nations.

Recognising the potential of tourism in the diversity of religious faiths, related festivals and structures, the tourism department launched a "Pilgrimage tourism" project. Major pilgrim tourism attractions include Guruvayur, Sabarimala, Malayatoor, Paradesi Synagogue, Arthunkal, Thumpoly church, St. Mary's Forane (Martha Mariam) church, Kuravilangad built in 105 A.D, Attukal Pongala (which has the Guinness record for being the largest gathering of women in the world), and Chettikulangara Bharani.

== Gallery ==
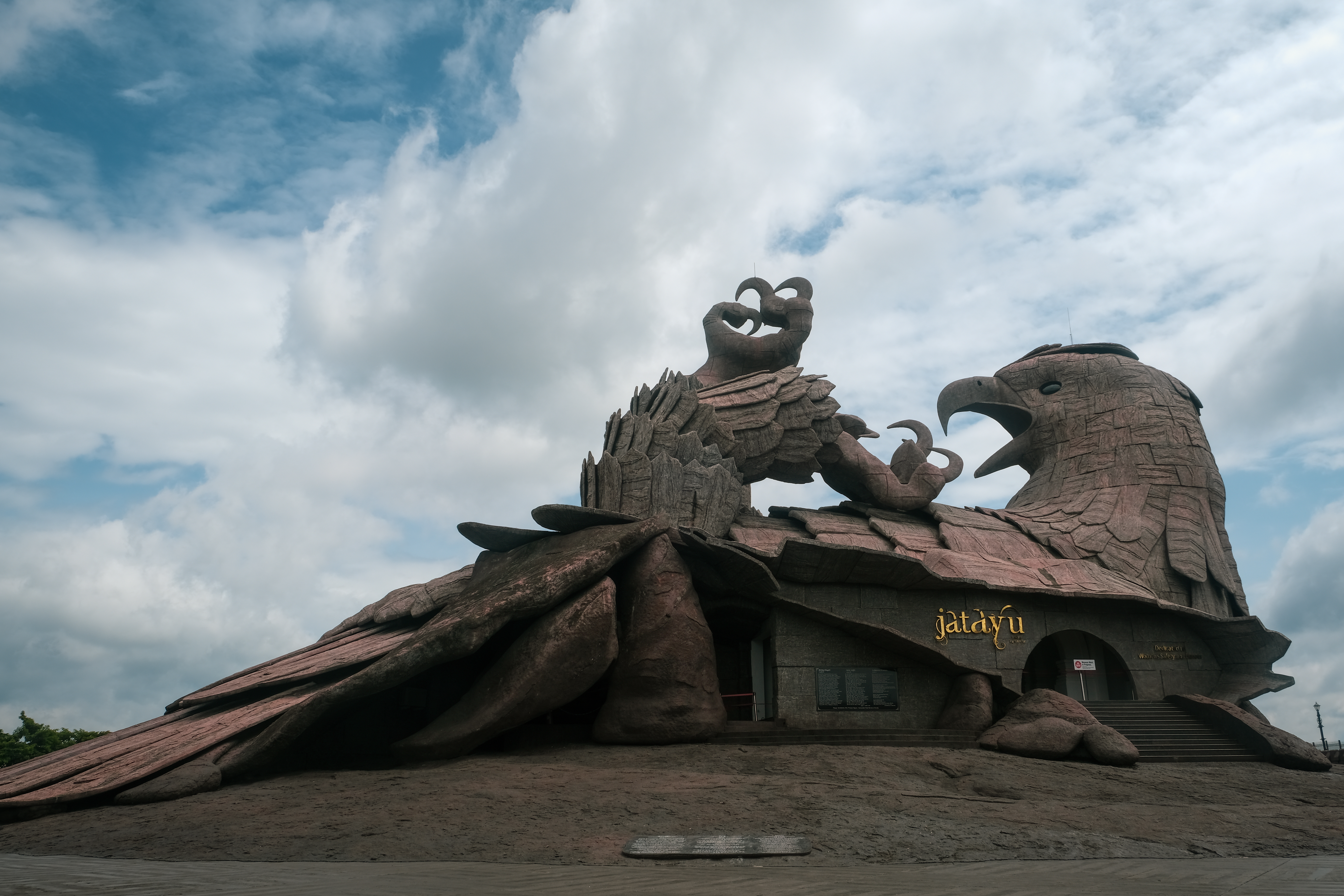
Jatayu Earth's Center Nature Park

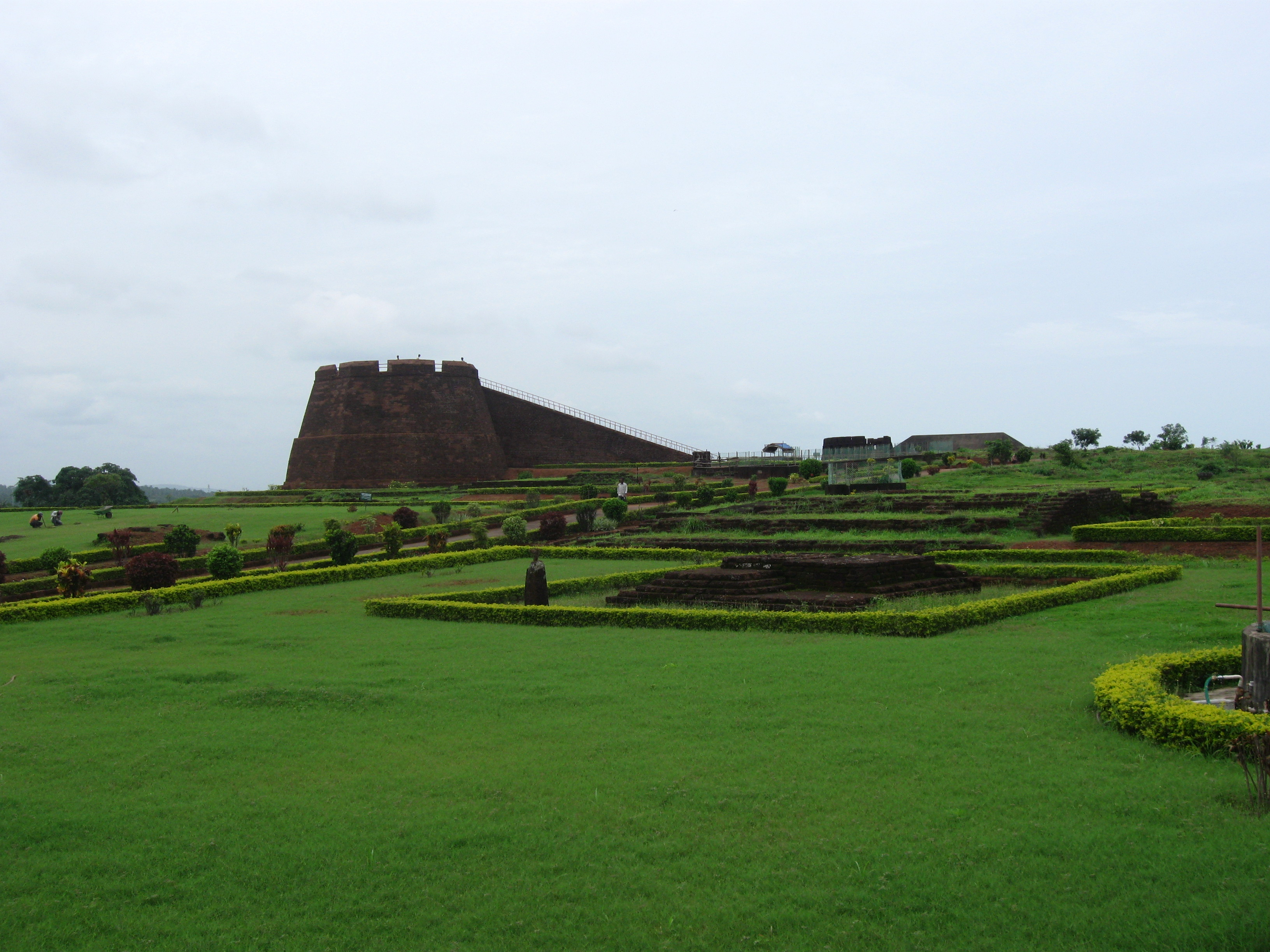
Bekal Fort

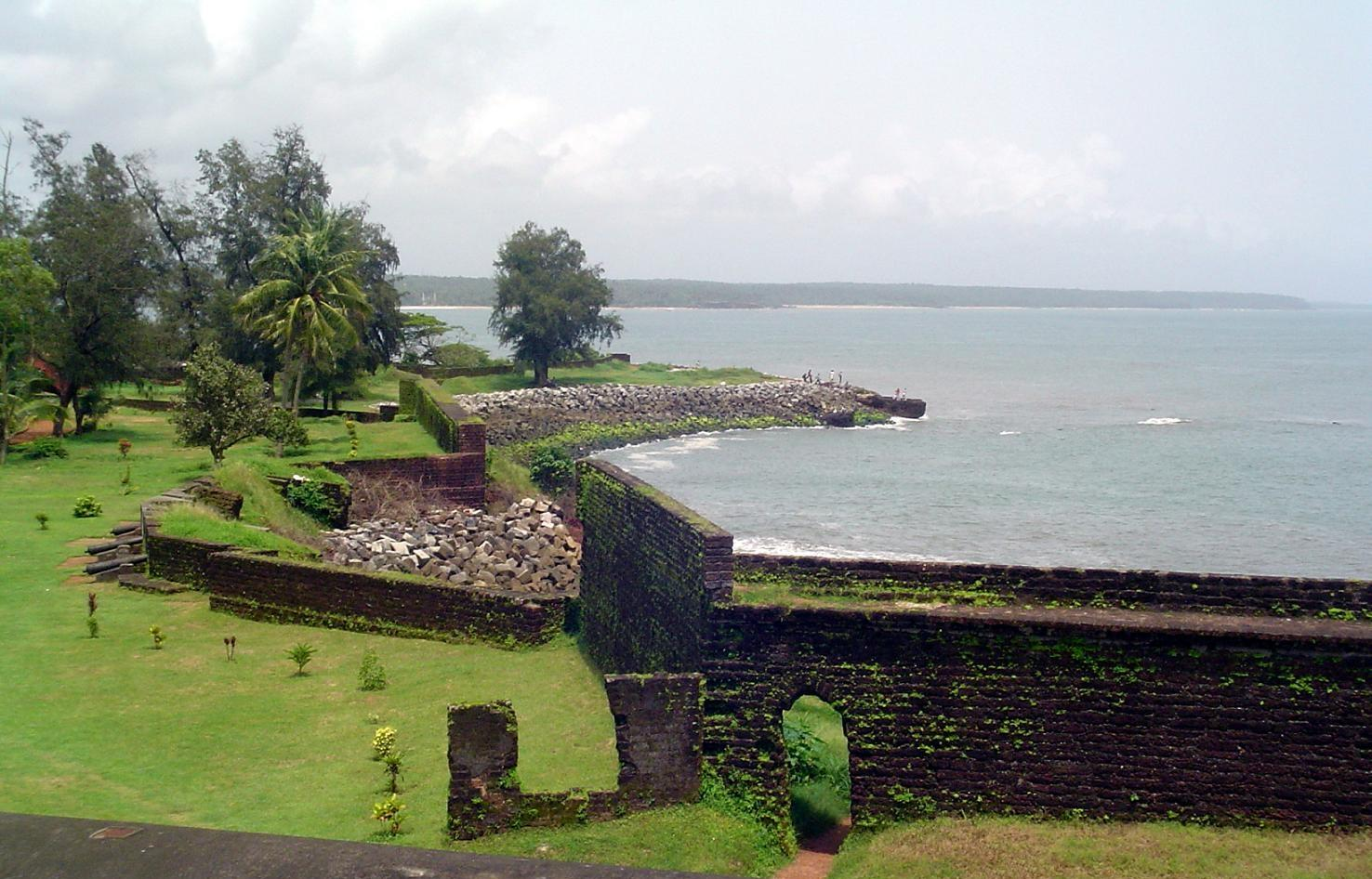
St. Angelo Fort

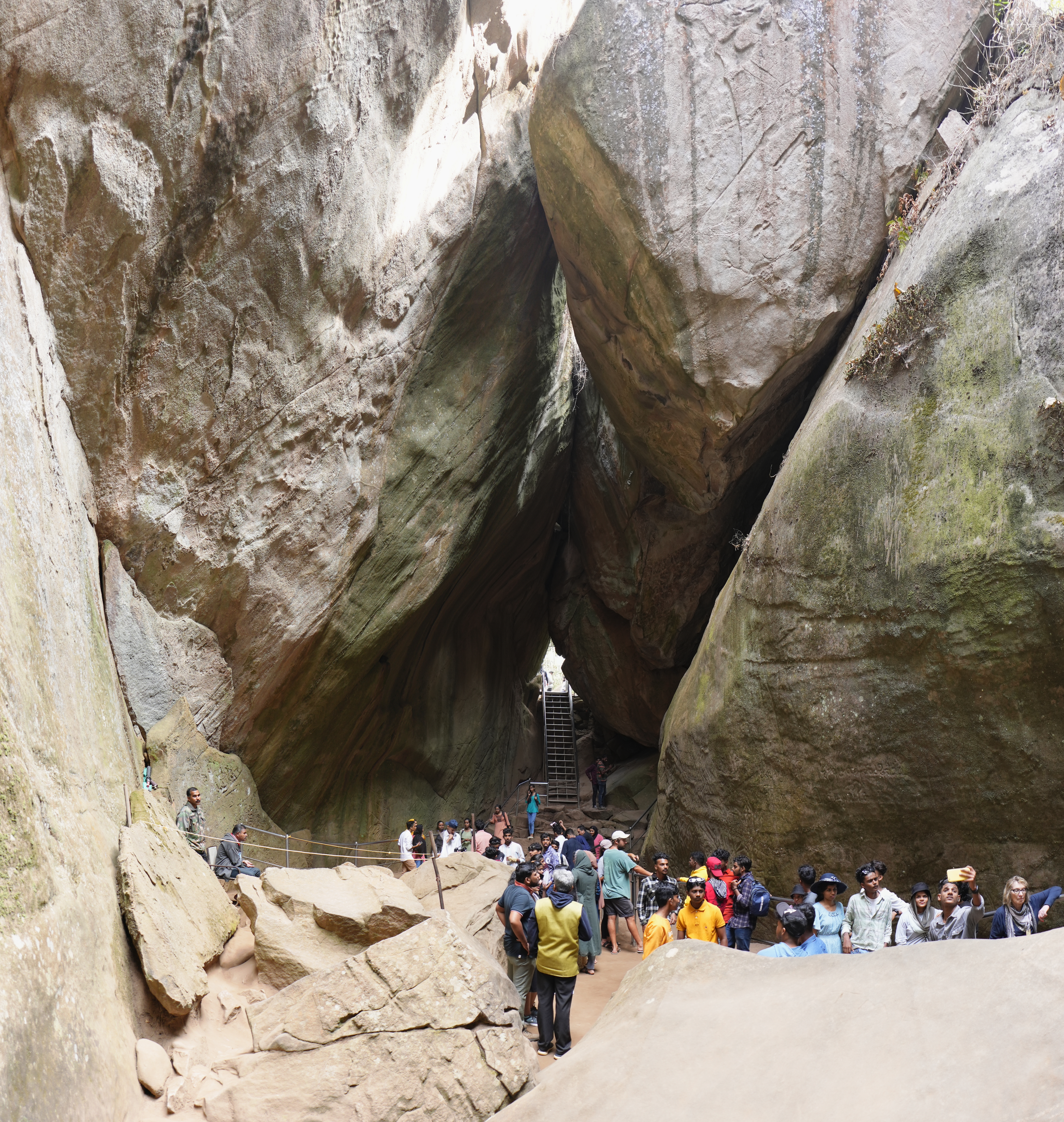
Edakkal caves

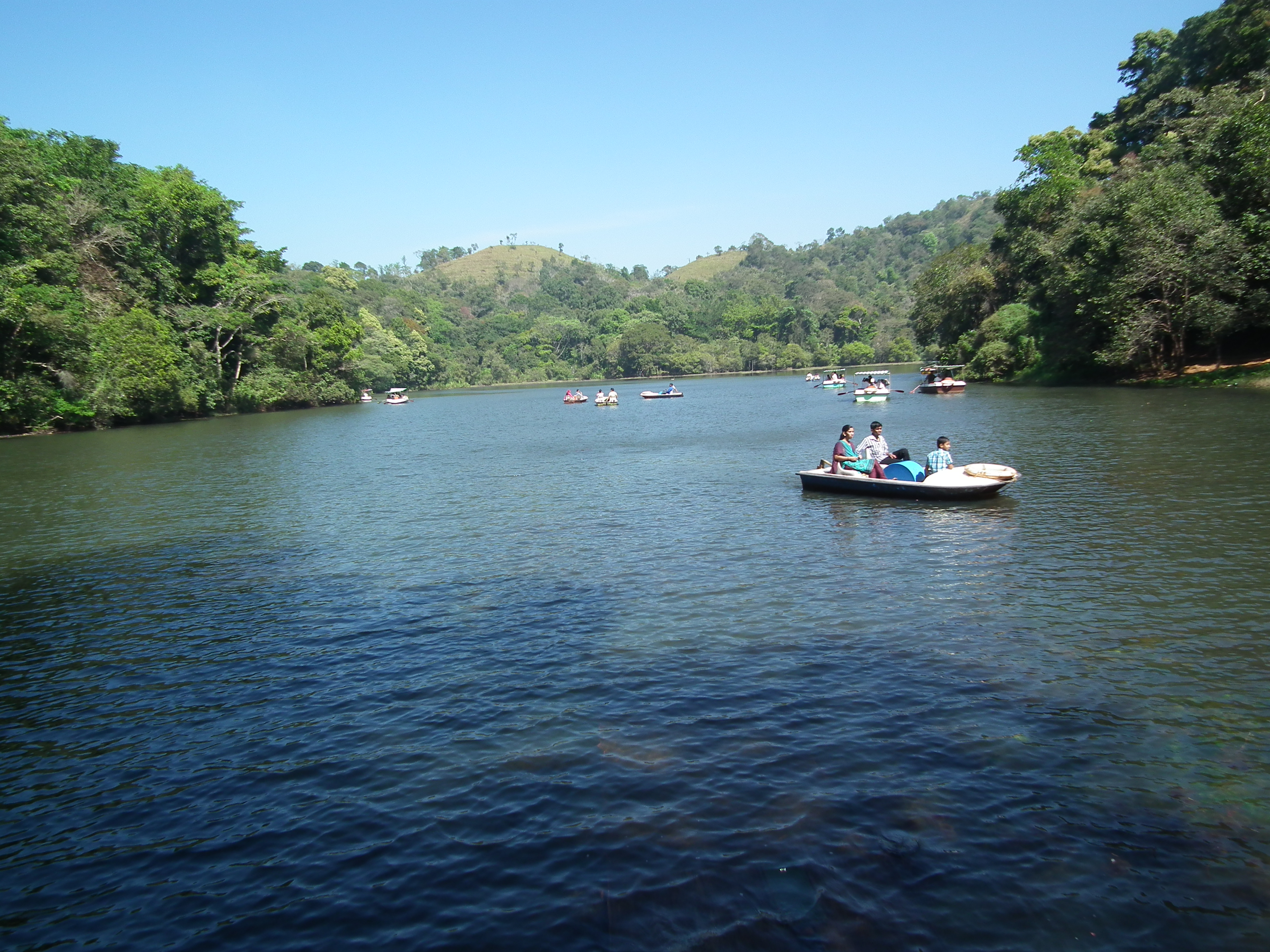
Pookode Lake

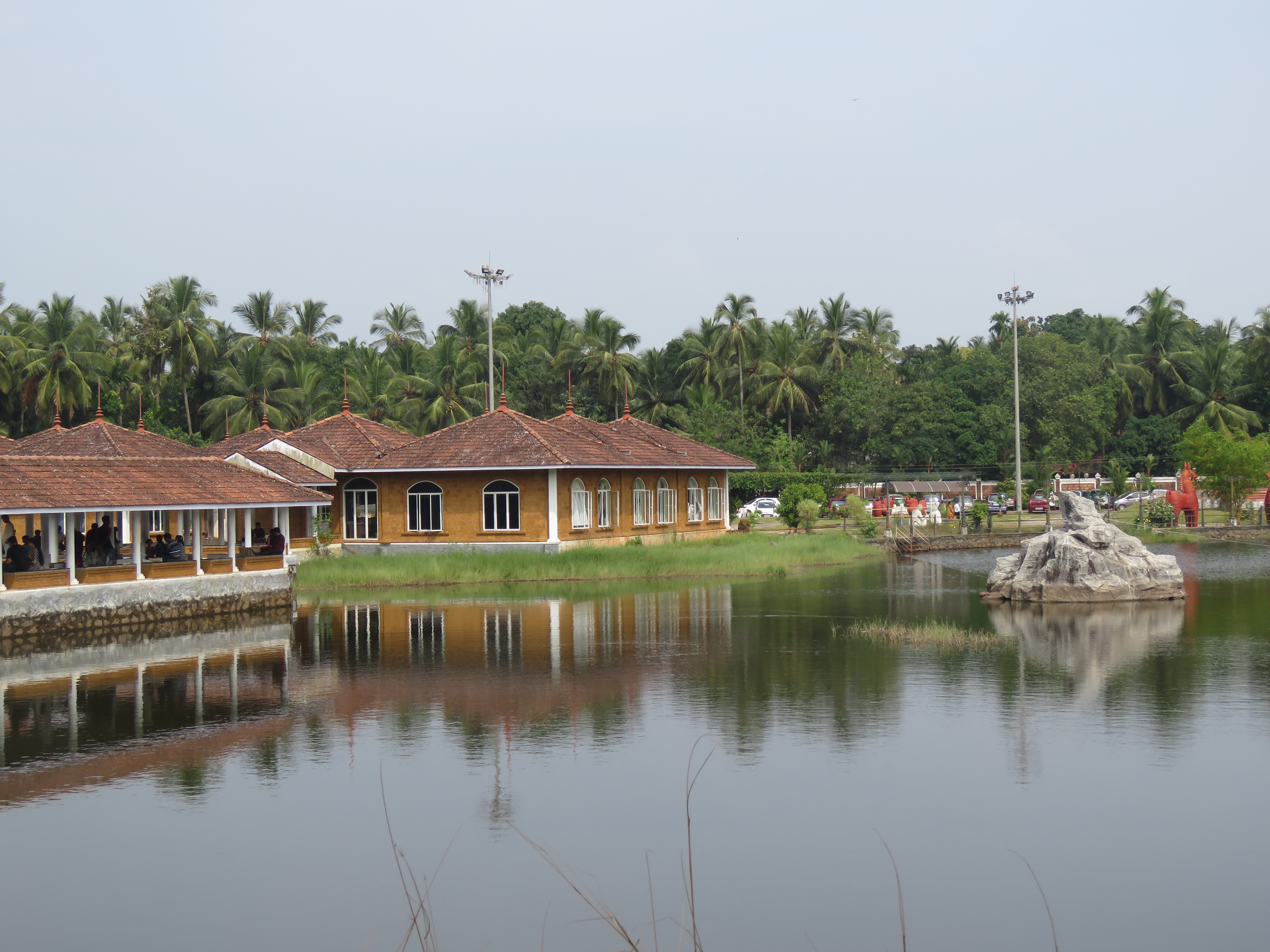
Sargaalaya Crafts Village

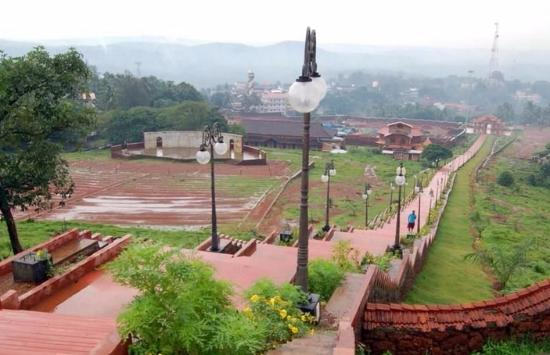
Kottakkunnu

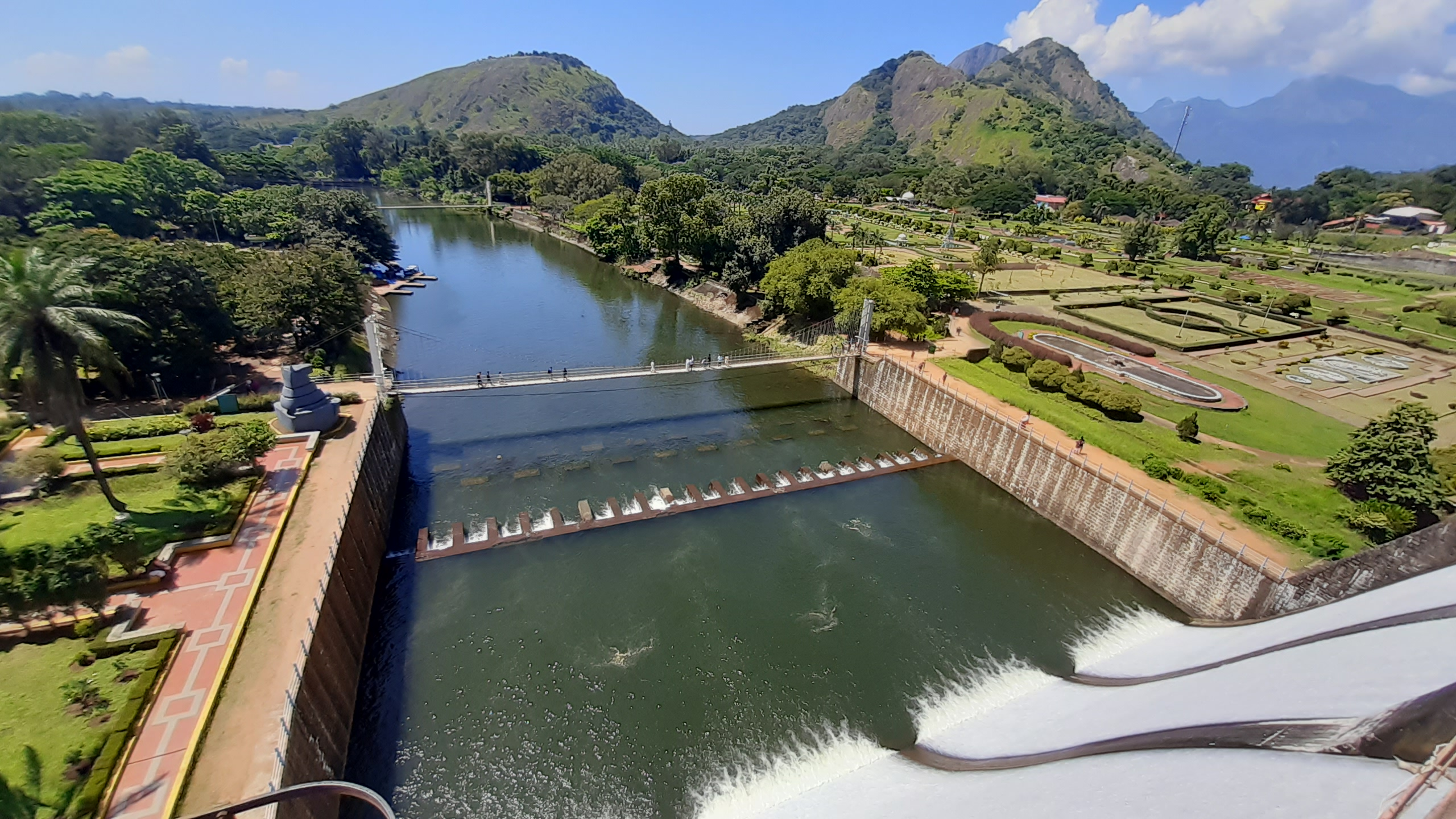
Malampuzha garden dam

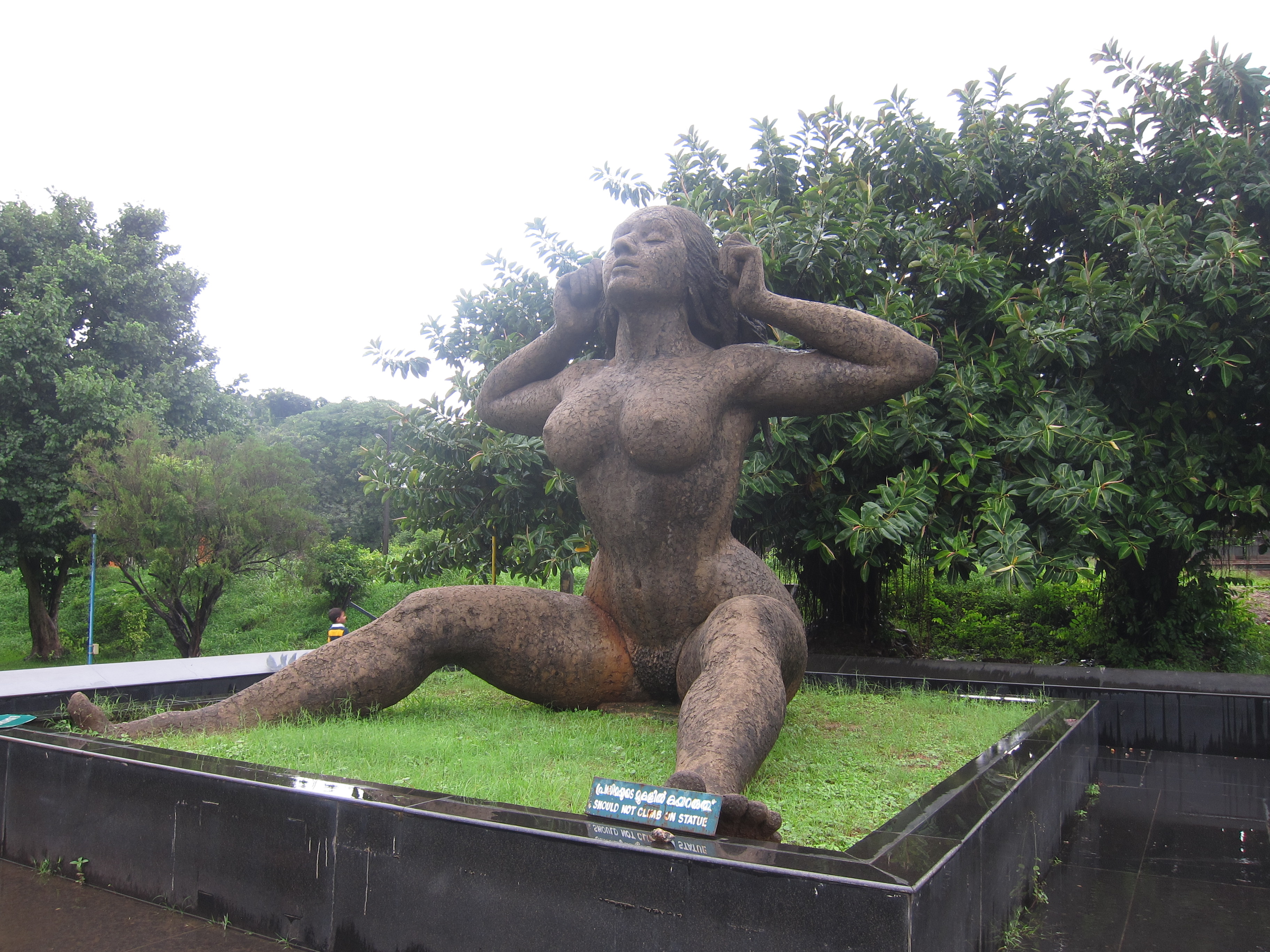
Yakshi

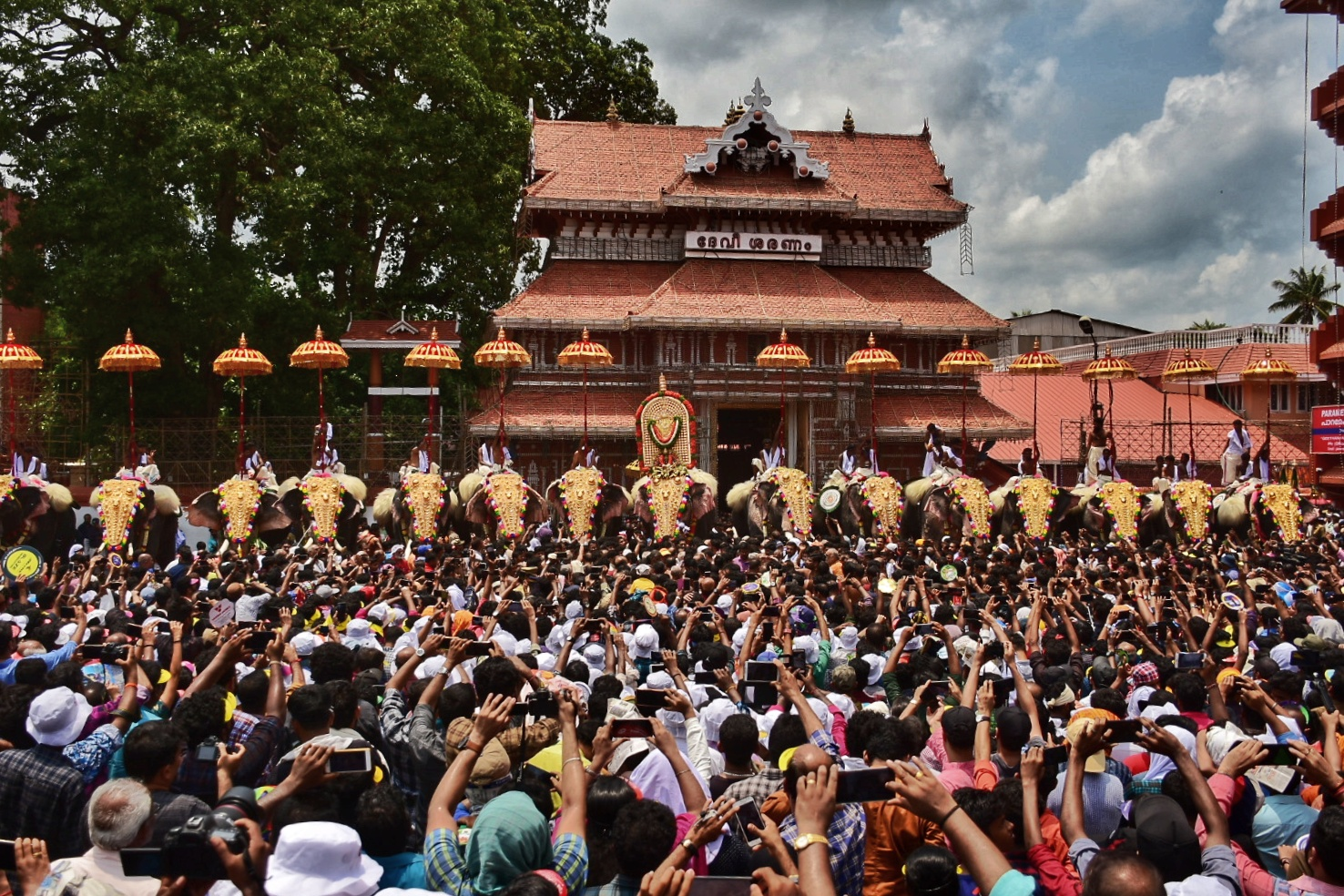
Vadakkunnathan Temple

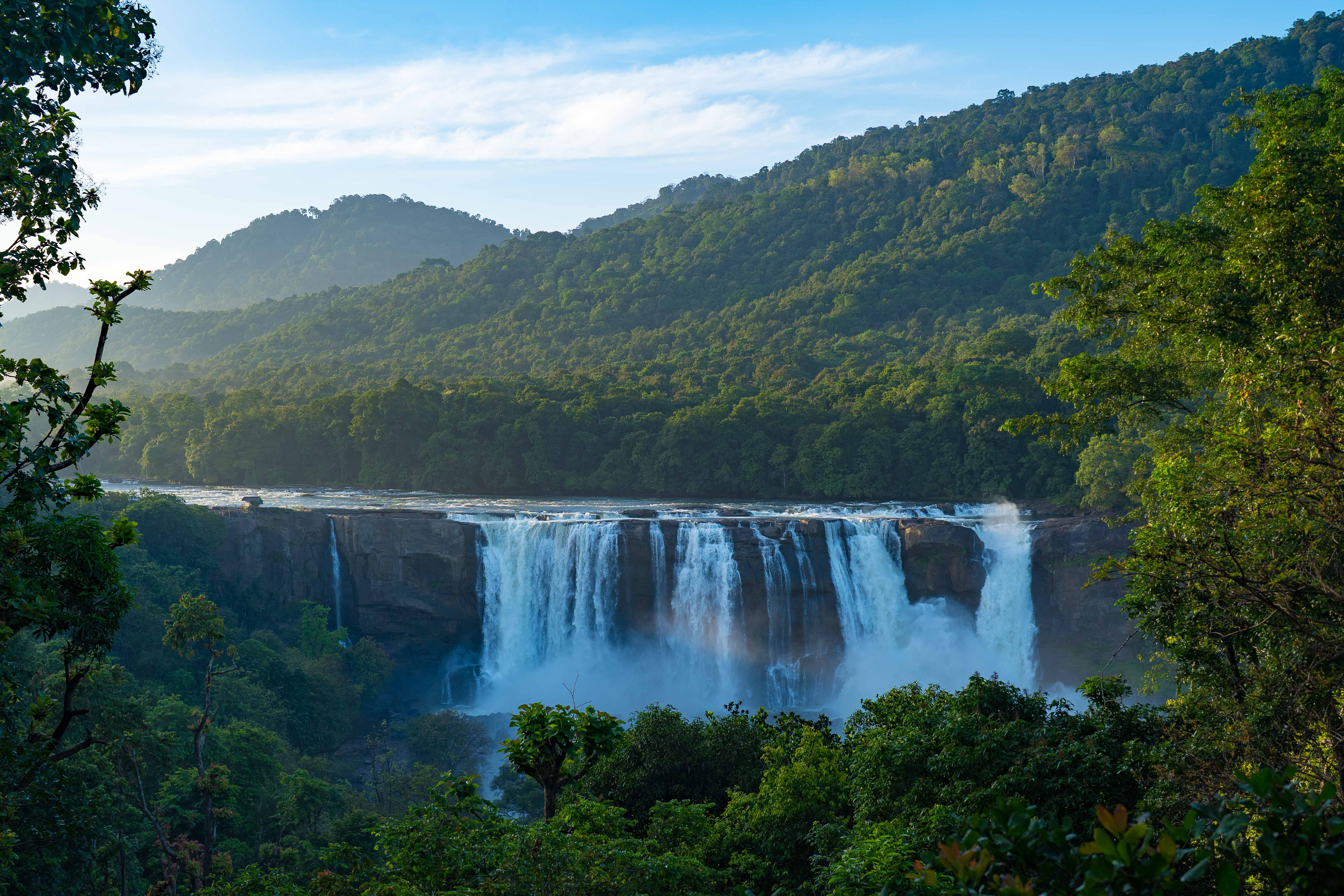
Athirapally Waterfalls

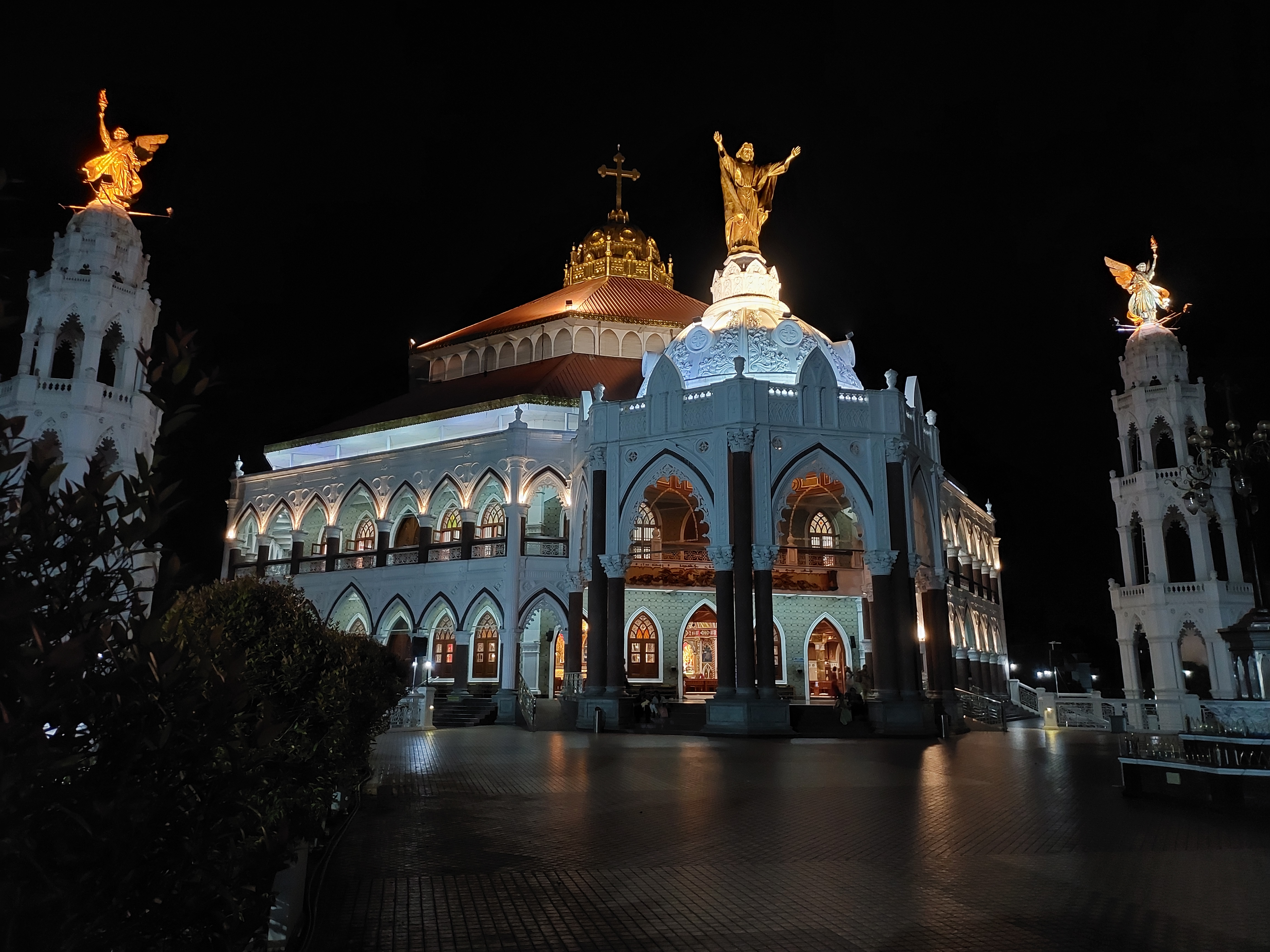
St. George's Syro-Malabar Forane Church, Edappally

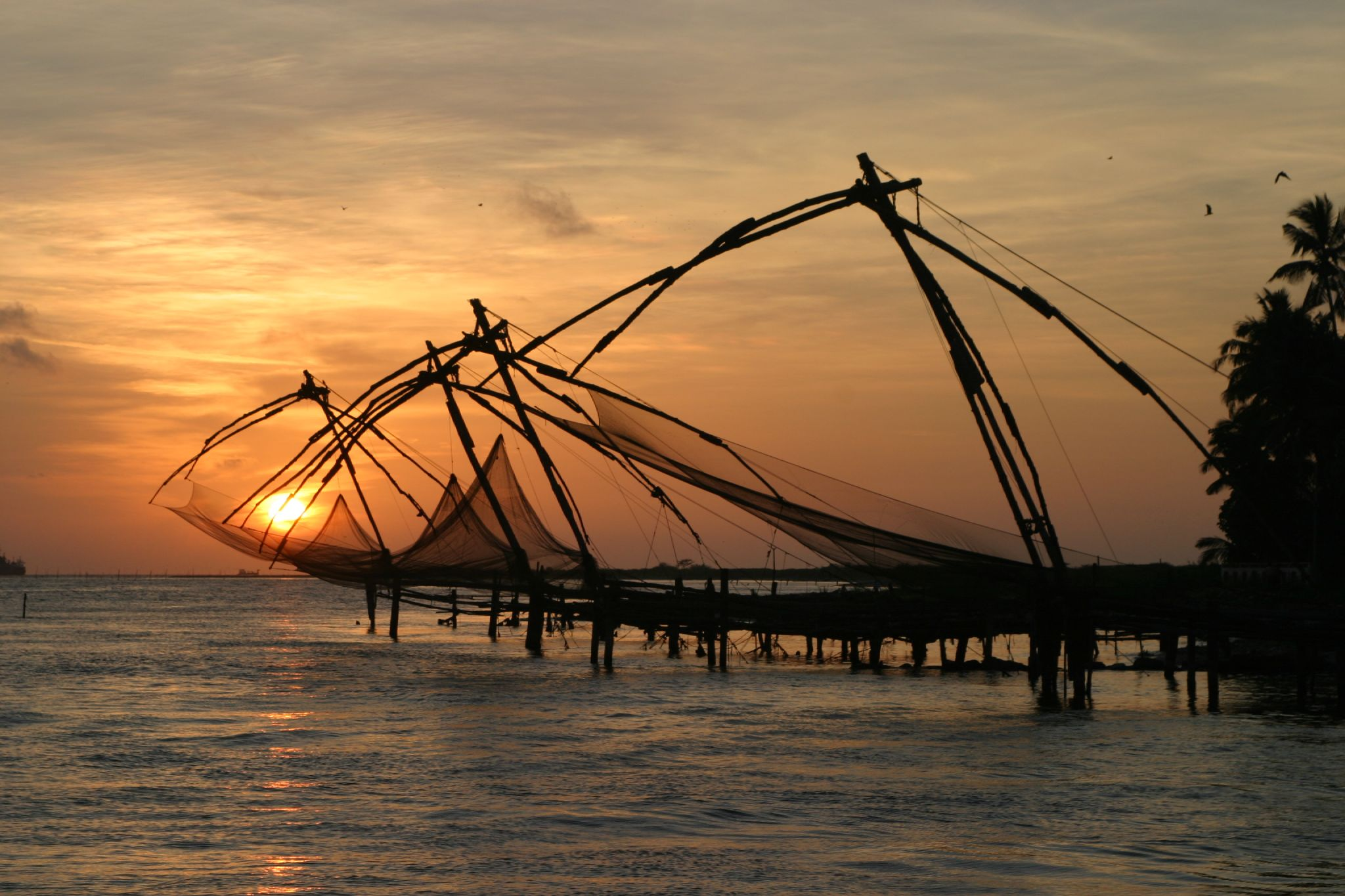
Chinese fishing nets in Kochi

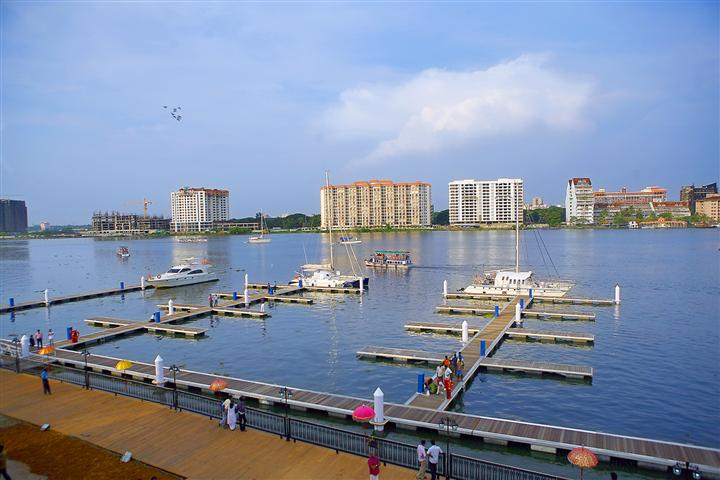
Kochi International Marina

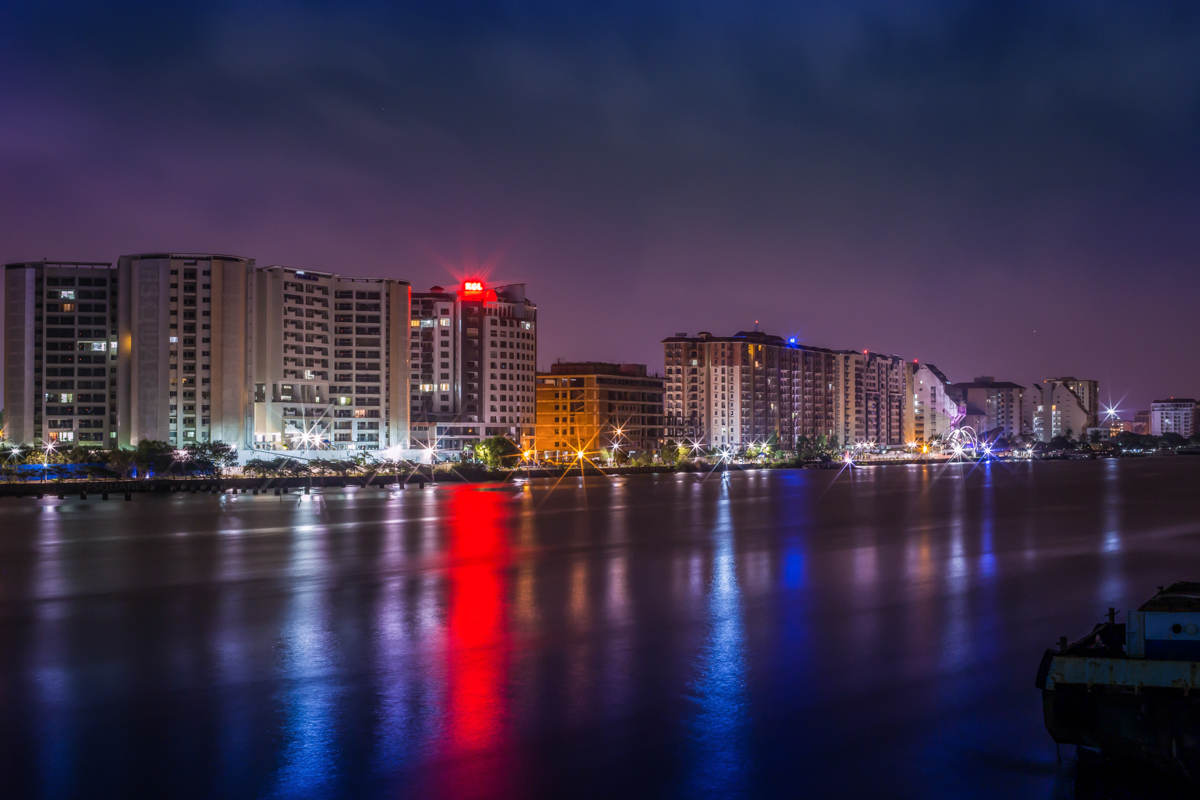
Marine Drive, Kochi

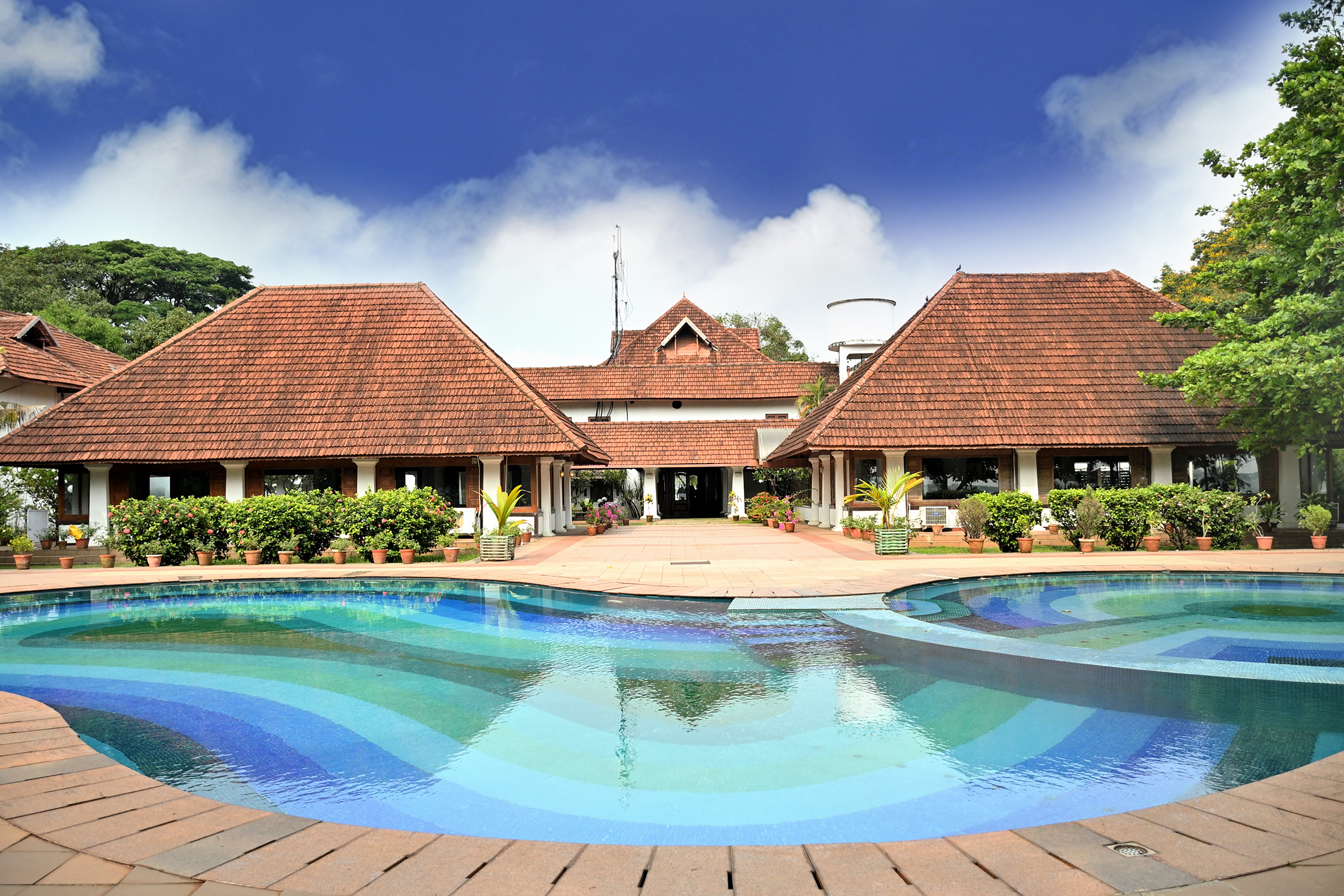
Bolgatty Palace

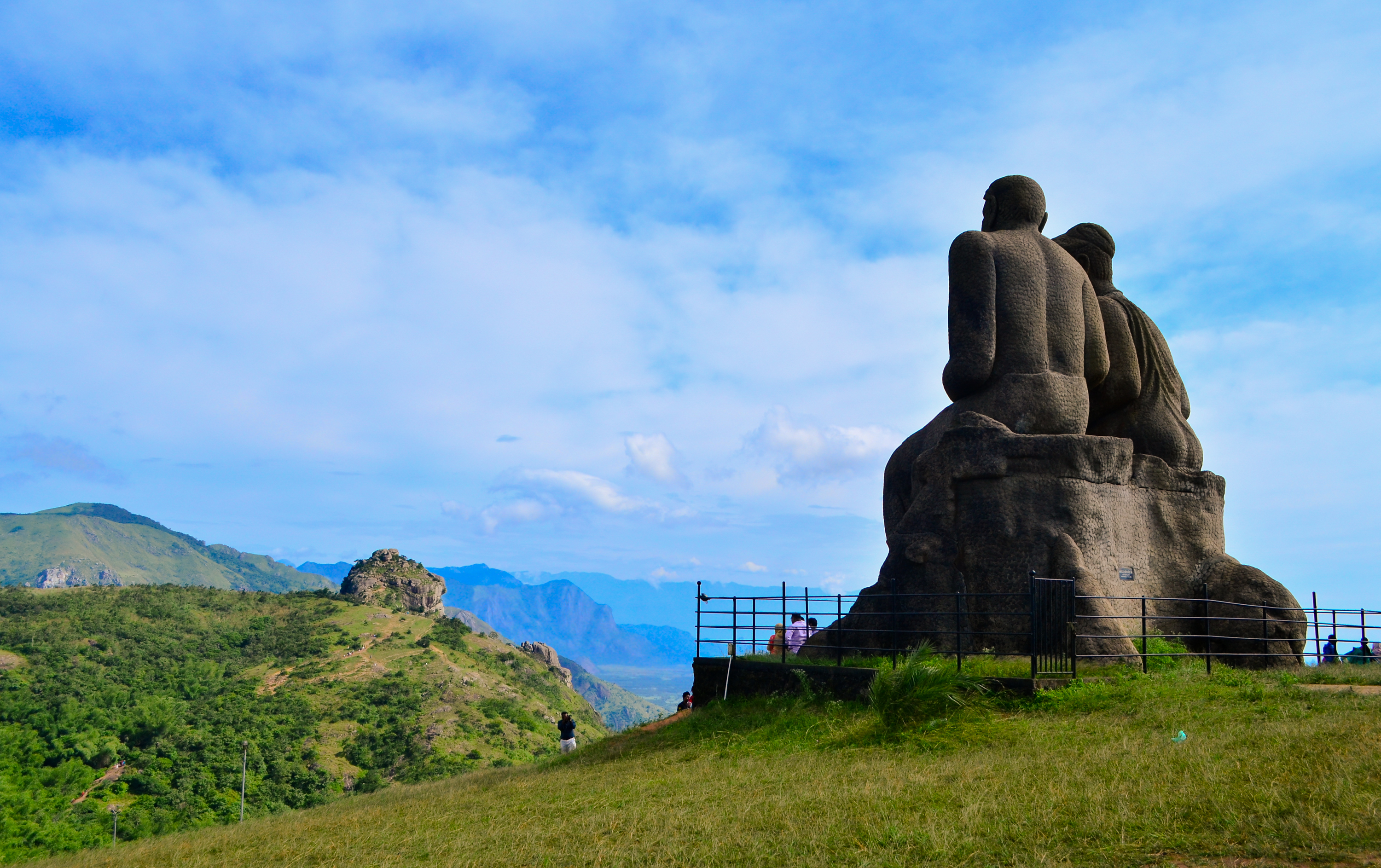
Ramakkalmedu

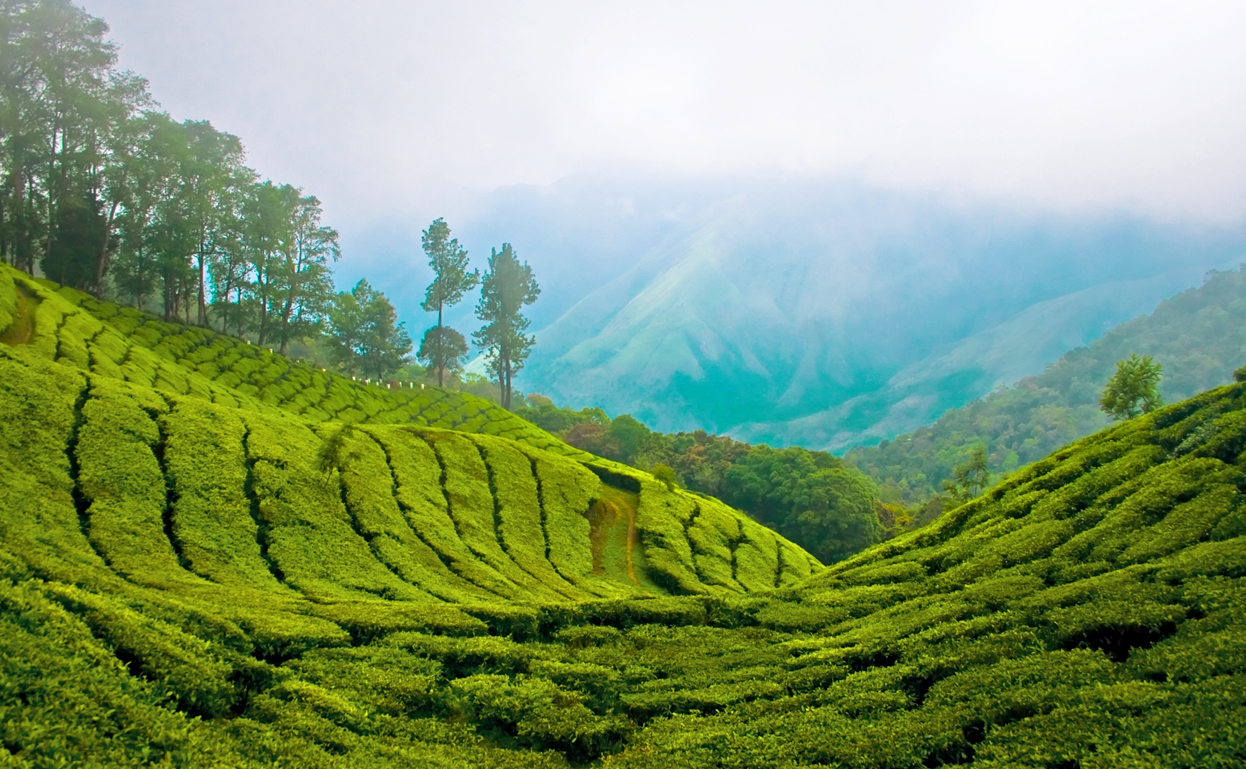
Munnar

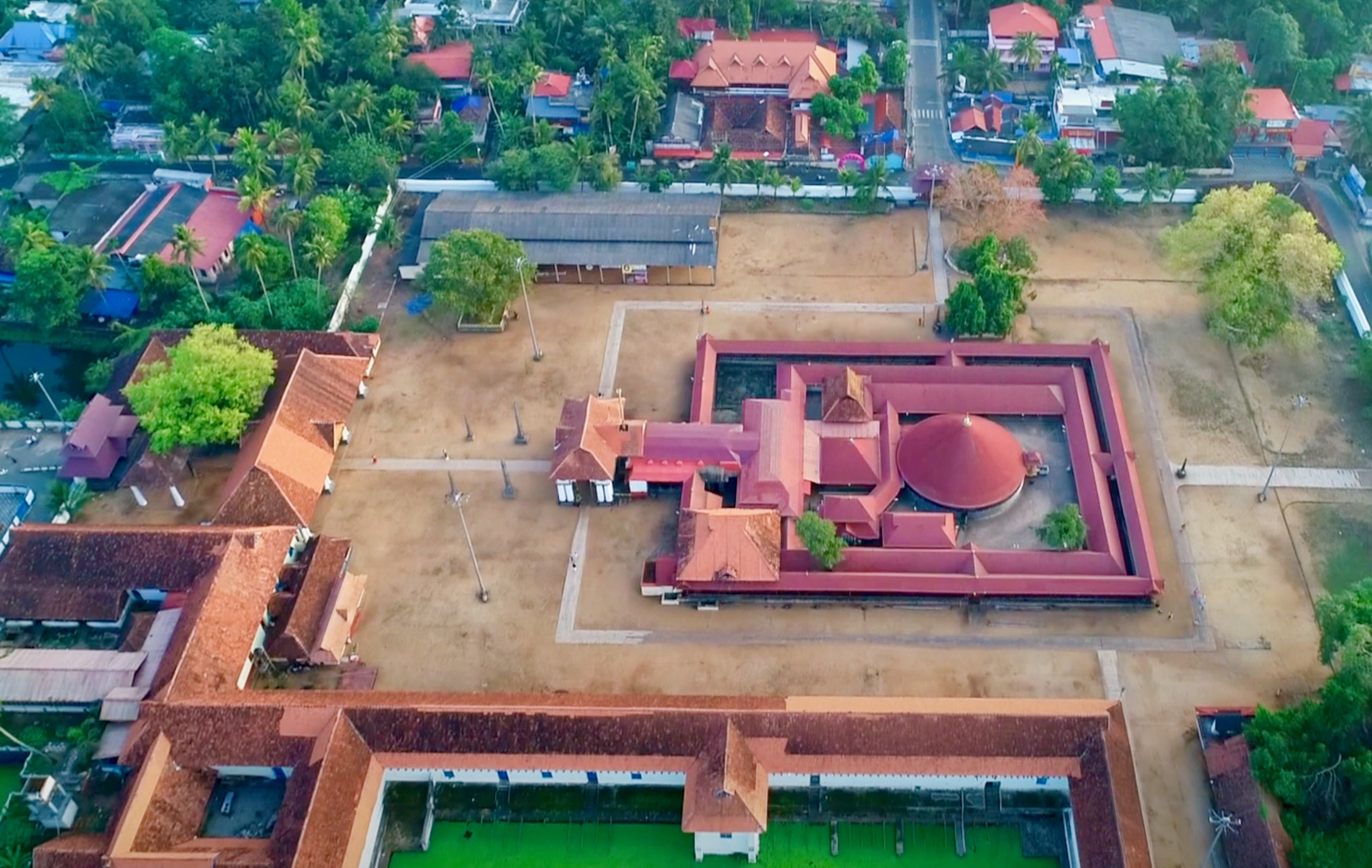
Vaikom Sree Mahadeva Temple

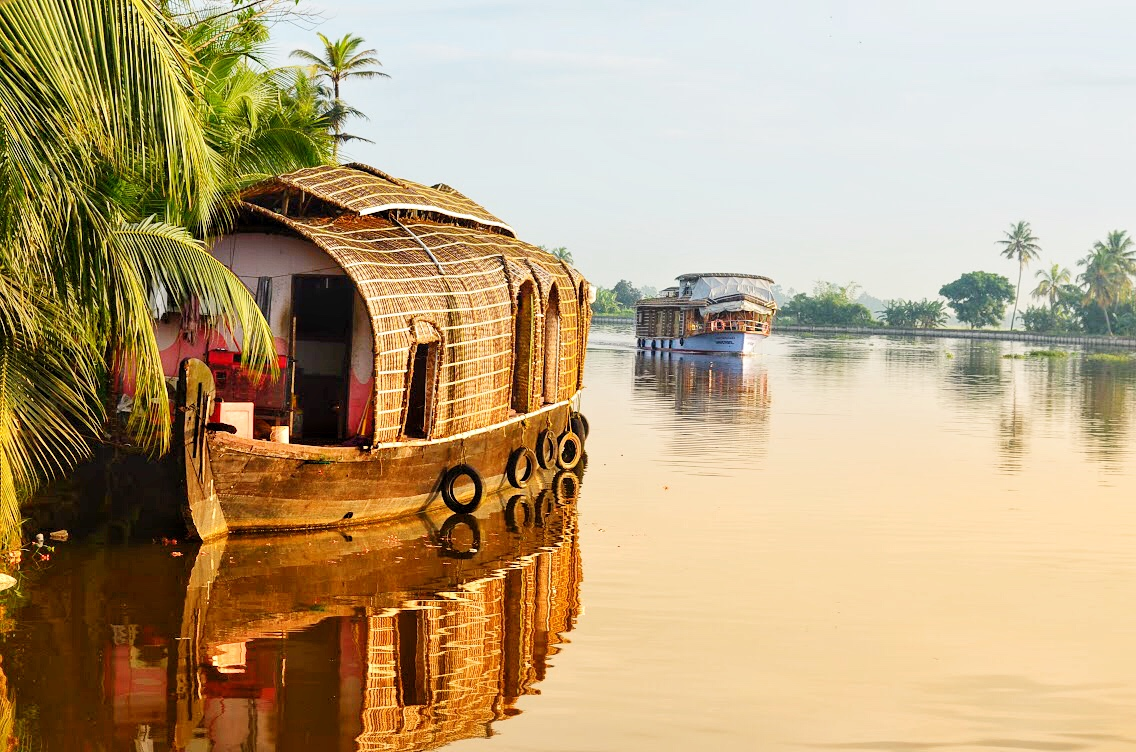
Alappuzha

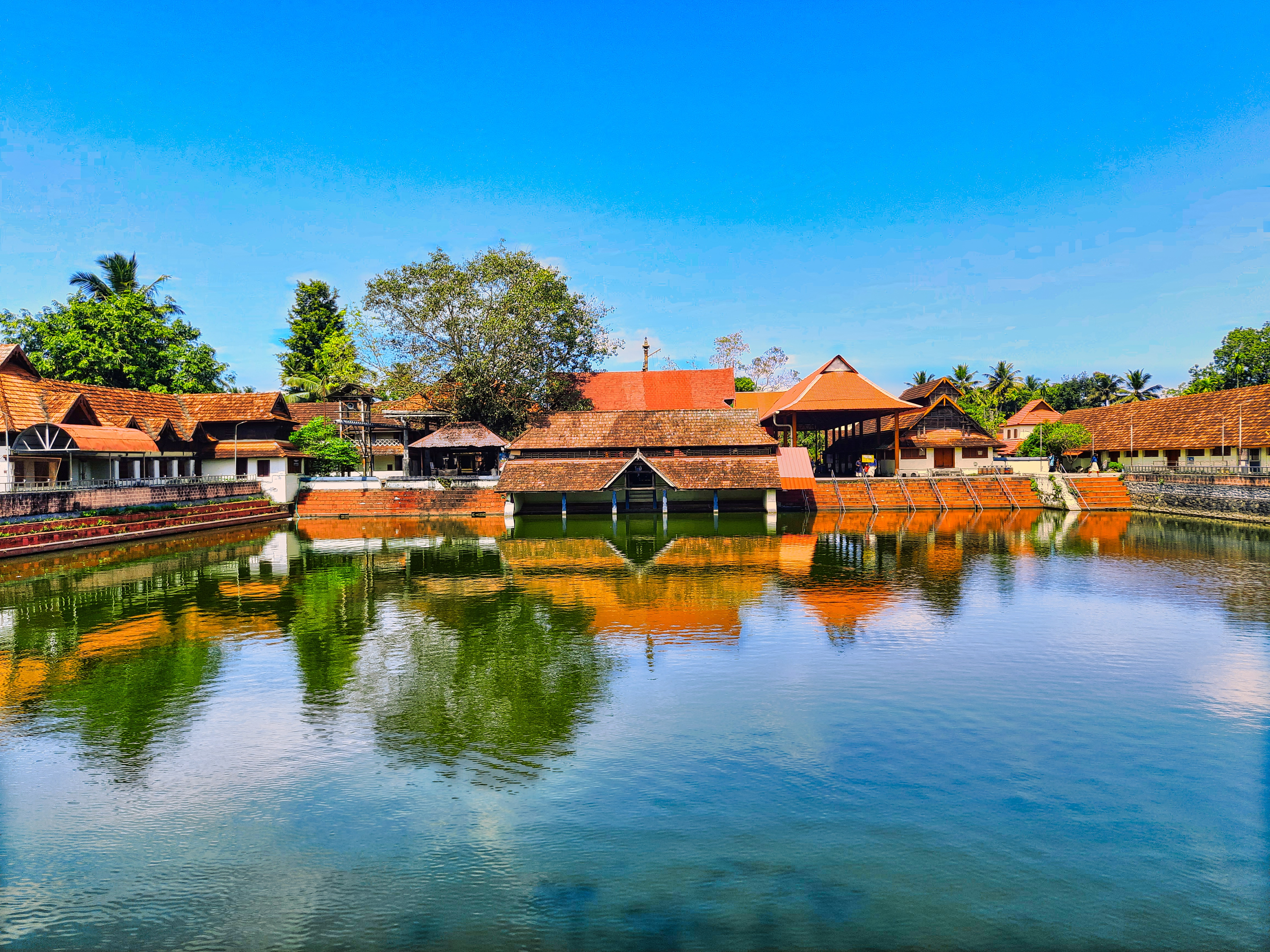
Ambalappuzha Sree Krishna Swamy Temple

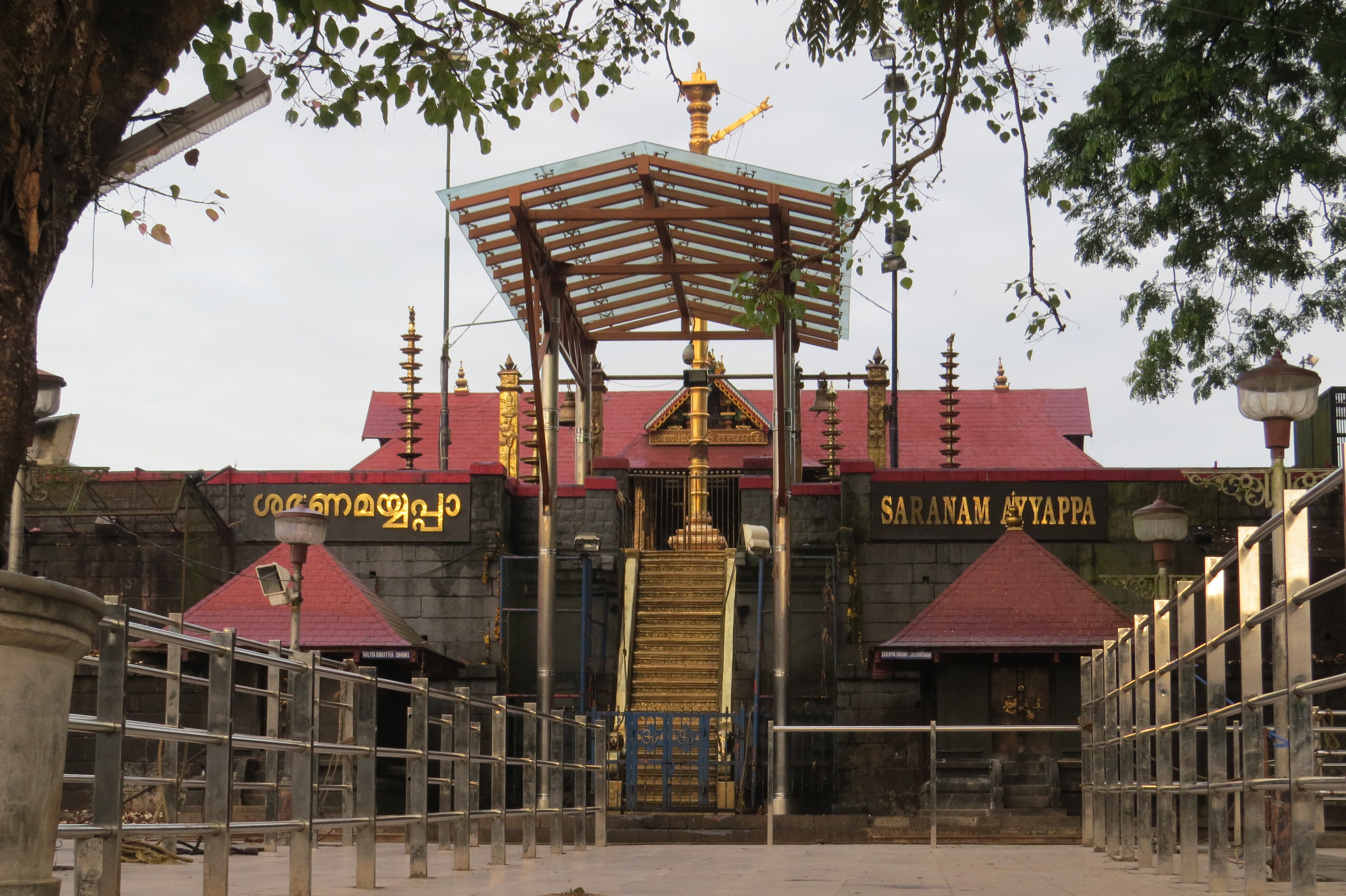
Sabarimala

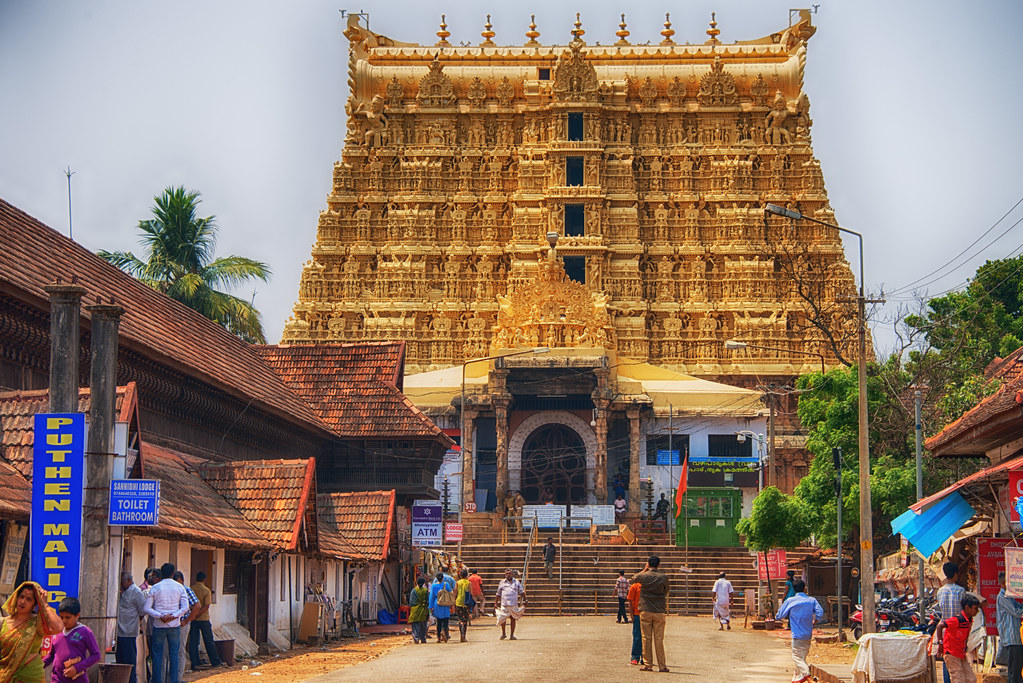
Padmanabhaswamy Temple

== Administration ==
Kerala Tourism is the popular name of the Department of Tourism, Government of Kerala. (website: keralatourism.org).

The Kerala Tourism Department is responsible for the sustainable development of tourism in Kerala. The department is headed by a Minister for Tourism, and incumbent minister is P. A. Mohammed Riyas.

Kerala Tourism Development Corporation (KTDC) was established by the Government of Kerala in 1966 and is the nodal agency responsible for the promotion of tourism and development of tourist related infrastructure in the state. At the district level, there are District Tourism Promotion Councils (DTPC).

Kerala has a dedicated Tourist Police Unit under the Kerala Police to ensure the safety and protection of tourists.

== See also ==
- History of Kerala
- Tourism in India
