= Administration of Alappuzha district =

Local government in India

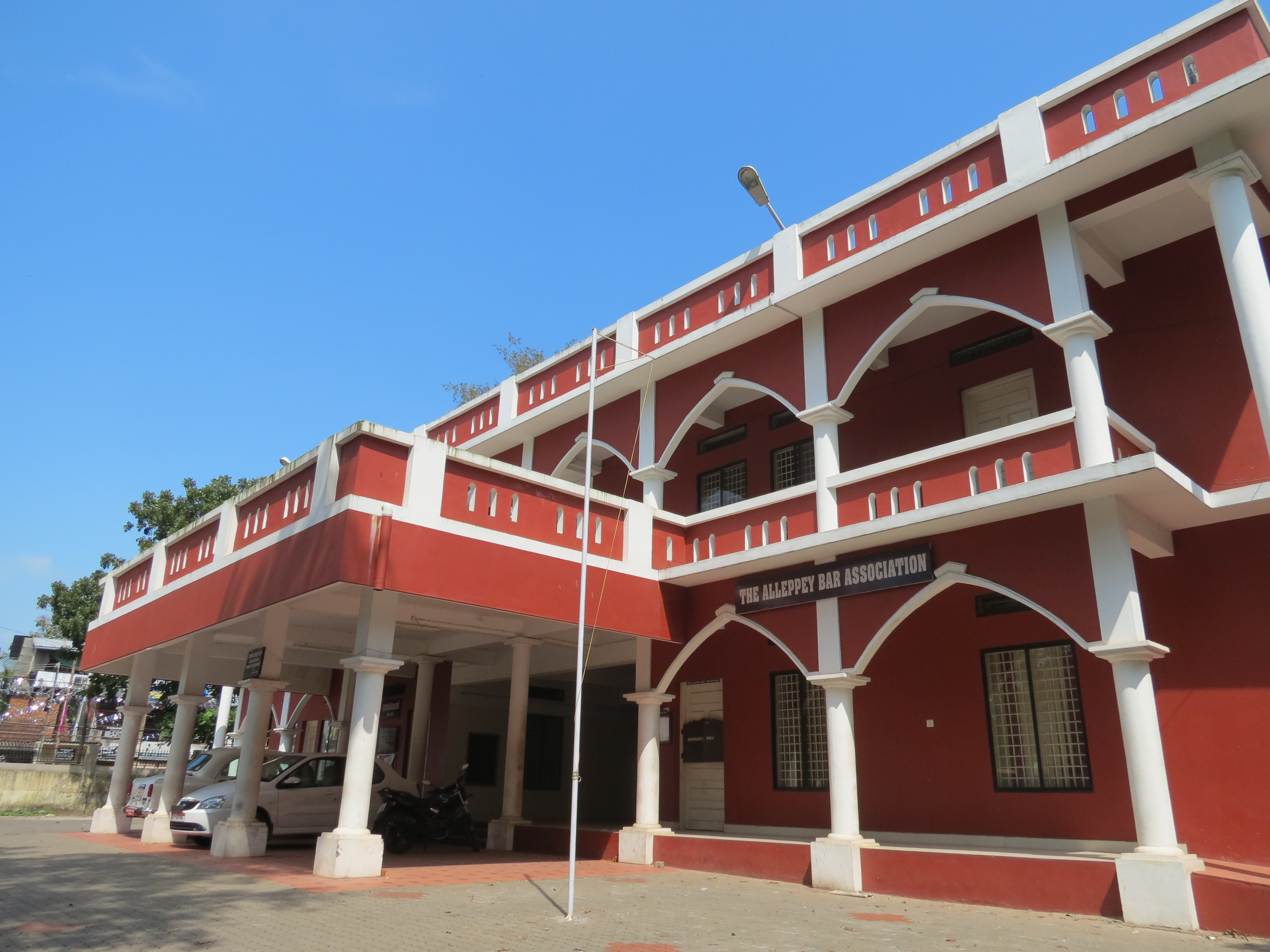
Alleppey District Court

Alappuzha District has four types of administrative hierarchies:

- Taluk and Village administration managed by the provincial government of Kerala state.
- Panchayaths and Municipalities Administration managed by the constitutional local self government bodies
- Parliament Constituencies for the Union of India
- Assembly Constituencies for the provincial government of Kerala state

Alex Varghese IAS is the District Collector and District Magistrate of Alappuzha.

== Municipalities ==
The municipalities in the district are:

- Alappuzha
- Chengannur
- Cherthala
- Kayamkulam
- Mavelikkara
- Haripad

== Taluks ==
Taluks in Alappuzha municipality are:

- Cherthala
- Ambalappuzha
- kuttanad
- Karthikappally
- Chengannur
- Mavelikkara

== Panchayats ==
The panchayats in the district are:

- Alaa
- Arattupuzha
- Arookutty
- Aroor
- Aryad
- Bharanikavu
- Champakulam
- Charummoodu
- Chennam Pallippuram
- Chennithala
- Cherthala South
- Cheruthana
- Chettikulangara
- Chunakkara
- Edathua
- Ezhupunna
- Kadakkarappally
- Kanjikkuzhi
- Kodamthuruth
- Krishnapuram
- Kuthiathode
- Mannancherry
- Mannar
- Mararikulam North
- Mararikulam South
- Muhamma
- Mulakuzha
- Muthukulam
- Muttar
- Nedumudy
- Nooranad
- Palamel
- Panavally
- Pathiyoor
- Pattanakkad
- Perumbalam
- Purakkad
- Thaikattussery
- Thakazhy
- Thalavady
- Thamarakkulam
- Thanneermukkom
- Thazhakara
- Thiruvanvandoor
- Thuravoor
- Vallikunnam
- Vayalar
- Venmony
- Purakkad
- Punnapra
- Ambalappuzha
- Veeyapuram

Alappuzha city officials
Municipal chairperson	Mrs.Soumya Raj
Superintendent of Police	Chaitra Teresa John IPS

The two administrative systems prevailing in the district are revenue and local self-government. Under the revenue system, the district is divided into two revenue divisions, six taluks and 91 villages. The two revenue divisions are Alappuzha division comprising Cherthala, Ambalapuzha and Kuttanad taluks consisting of 47 villages and Chengannur division comprising Karthikapally, Chengannur and Mavelikkara taluks consisting of 44 villages. For census purposes, Aroor, Arookutty, Kodamthuruth, Thanneermukkom Vadakku, Thaneermukkam Thekku, Vayalar East and Kokkothamangalam village, except the portions included in Cherthala municipality are treated in the 1981 census as census towns based on the threefold criteria adopted for treating a place as census town.

Under the local self-government system, the district is divided into five statutory towns and development blocks consisting of 71 panchayats. The jurisdiction of a Development Block includes the areas falling in census towns also.

There were nine legislative assembly segments in Alappuzha district for the 2011 Assembly elections. They are Aroor, Cherthala, Alappuzha, Kuttanad, Haripad, Kayamkulam, Mavelikkara and Chengannur.

Alappuzha assembly constituency is part of Alappuzha (Lok Sabha constituency). The other Lok Sabha constituency of the district is Mavelikkara
