= State Highway 5 (Kerala) =

Kayamkulam town to pathanapuram town

State Highway 5
- SH 5 highlighted in red

Route information
- Maintained by Kerala Public Works Department
- Length: 42.5 km (26.4 mi)

Major junctions
- West end: NH 66 in Kayamkulam
- NH 183 in Charummoodu; SH 1 in Adoor
- East end: SH 8 in Pathanapuram

Location
- Country: India
- State: Kerala
- Districts: Alappuzha, Pathanamthitta, Kollam

Highway system
- Roads in India; Expressways; National; State; Asian; State Highways in Kerala
← SH 3	→ SH 6

State Highway 5 (SH 5) is a state highway in Kerala, India that starts in Kayamkulam and ends at Pathanapuram. The highway is 42.5 km long. This highway is also called as KP Road or Kayamkulam - Pathanampuram Road and the road helps interstate transportation between Alappuzha district and Tenkasi, Tuticorin.

== Route description ==
Kayamkulam - Kattanam - Charumood - Nooranad Junction -Pazhakulam junction - Adoor - Pathanapuram - Kallumkadavu junction (meet and ends at Main Eastern Highway (SH 8)).

== See also ==
- Roads in Kerala
- List of state highways in Kerala
