= Padanilam =

Padanilam Nooranad Padanilam
- town
- Nickname: Pakshi gramam (Village of birds) Nandikesha Paithruka Gramam
- Interactive map of Padanilam
- Coordinates: 9°11′34.07″N 76°38′9.64″E
- Country: India
- State: Kerala
- District: Alappuzha

Government
  - Type: Panchayath
  - Body: Nooranad Panchayath

Area
  - Total: 21 km^{2} (8.1 sq mi)

Population (2011)
  - Total: 25,375
  - Density: 1,208/km^{2} (3,130/sq mi)
- Demonym: Nooranattukar

Languages
  - Official: Malayalam, English
- Time zone: UTC+5:30 (IST)
- PIN: 690529
- Vehicle registration: KL 31, KL 4
- Nearest city: Kollam
- Lok Sabha constituency: Mavelikkara
- Vidhan Sabha constituency: Mavelikkara
- Civic agency: Nooranad Panchayath
- Sex ratio: 1.204 ♀/♂
- Literacy: 96%
- Website: www.padanilamtemple.org

Padanilam is a town located in Onattukara region of Alappuzha district, Kerala. The word Padanilam means "land of battles" (pada means "battle" and nilam means "land"). It is located on the banks of river Achankovil. The Padanilam temple is one of the important centres of worship in Kerala. Nooranad is named as the Nandikesha Paithruka Gramam (Heritage village of Nandikesha) by the Government of Kerala due to its importance in kettukala construction, which is an icon of Onattukara region.

The Shivaratri is the most important festival in Padanilam. It is the biggest Shivaratri kettukazhcha in Kerala and it is second only to Aluva Shivaratri in terms of crowd gathering.

== Geography ==
Nooranadu Padanilam is situated on the south-eastern edge of the Alappuzha district. It is bounded by Venmony Panchayath in the north, Pandalam municipality and Palamel in the east, Mavelikkara Thamarakkulam in the south and Chunakkara and Thazhakara in the west. The Achankovil river is flows westwards through the northern boundary of the village. Topographically, the village has 3 areas: small hills, slope regions and plain land. Hills include the Pattoor malamukal and the koombuloor mala. The Pattoor malamukal is the highest point in the village with an altitude of 121 m above sea level. Laterite is the soil type found here. Alluvium and loam soil types can be found in the low lying areas of the village including plain lands.

== Padanilam Parabrahma Temple ==
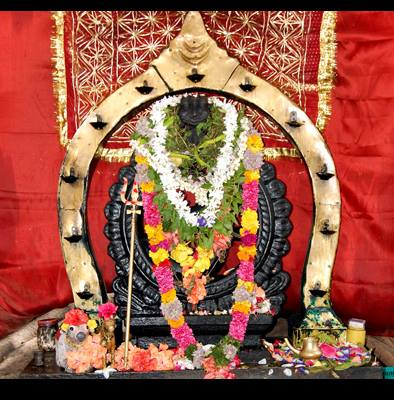
Parabrahma moorthy

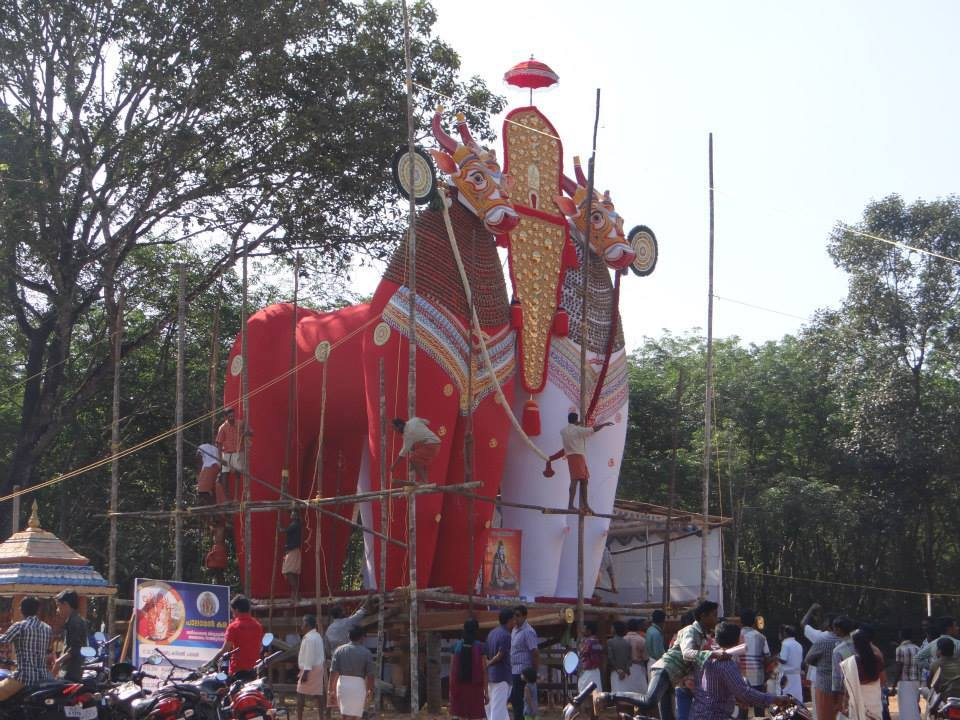
Image of a kettukala from Padanilam Shivarathri

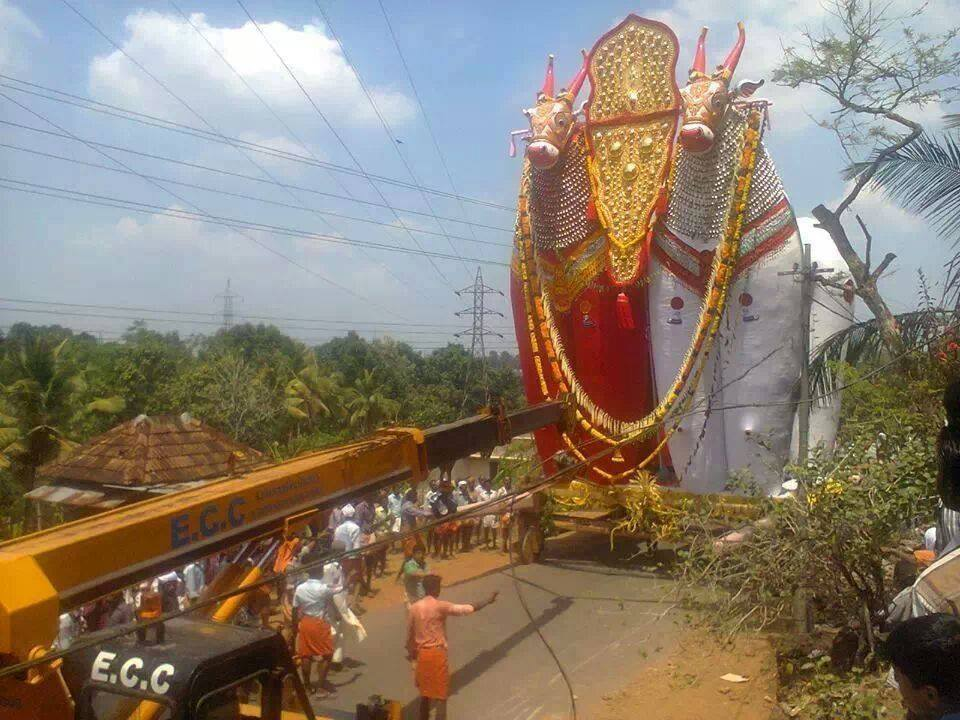
View of a huge nandikesh from Padanilam Shivarathri

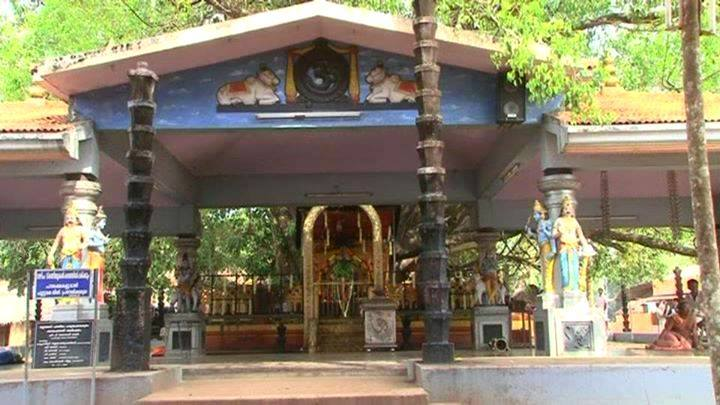
Padanilam Parabrahma Temple

The Padanilam Parabrahma Temple is one of the major temples in Kerala. The presiding deity of the temple is Lord Parabrahma. The temple is very much like the Oachira Parabrahma Temple. The temple has no compound walls and no roofs. A large number of festivals are celebrated here annually. The temple is one of the idathaavalam of Sabarimala Ayyappa Swami temple. There are KSRTC buses from Padanilam to Pamba during the Mandalam - Makaravilakku season. The temple has mainly 15 karakal (territories), who conduct the annual Sivarathri Festival. This is one of the biggest Nandikesha (ox vehicle of Lord Shiva) kettulsavams in Kerala.

== History ==
=== Early history ===
The Padanilam Temple is believed to be Swayambhu. Its actual history and the facts about how worship started there are unknown. Padanilam has been the administrative centre of Nooranad and it has history of intense conflict between various karakal (territories) around the temple. This was for gaining control over the temple administration and thereby controlling the entire village. Due to this pada (battle/conflict), the place is said to have got its name. It is believed that the army troops of Kayamkulam Kingdom had camped near the temple for protecting the kingdom from the attack of neighbouring kings. During this period, the village had some chieftains and their supporters. They include Noorukodi Unnithans, Kadackal Kuruppans, Vettathasaans and Vettadickal Kuruppans. Kayamkulam Raja withdrew his troops about four centuries ago. This initiated tensions between the chieftains for control of the village. Thus they divided into south and north, starting a fierce battle. The south side consisted of Noorukodi Unnithans and Kadackal Kuruppans. The north side had Vettathasans and Vettadickal Kuruppans with them. Twenty-two karakal supported their respective sides. During the battle, many soldiers on both sides died in large numbers. They were buried in the chira near the temple. Even from very earliest of times, this temple was a blessing for the people in the surrounding areas. It is also believed that the battle was between the king Marthanda Varma on one side and the king of Kayamkulam on the other. The twenty-two karakals of Nooranad picked their respective sides. The common people started worrying about the devastation of the war and approached the Pazhoor Panamana Thampuran to find a solution to end the war. He tried to intervene but the parties were not in a position to stop. He made a tent in the eastern part of the temple and started fasting unto death. But even that did not deter the warring parties. When he was on the verge of death due to the fast, they fearing the Brahmanasaapam, agreed to stop war. They demarcated the boundary in the north-south direction and stopped the war in the name of Parabrahma, the presiding deity of the temple. The St. Thomas Syrian Orthodox Church is about 150 meters from the Padanilam Market and Padanilam High School. It is an old church which was founded 100 years before and the founder Mr. Varu Varghese was originally from Kuravilangadu. He belongs to the family of Pakalomattom, which was said to be one among the four families which were said to be baptized by St. Thomas, the disciple of Jesus Christ in AD 52. His tomb is at the St. Thomas Orthodox Church. Two brothers of the family came to Padanilam and one is settled in Padanilam and the other in Nooranad. One of the patriarchs of the family is known as Padanilathu Ashaan (late Mr. Geevarghese Kochukunju) and the junction north to the church is known as Ashaan Mukku. The St. Thomas Orthodox Church and the Padanilam Parabrahma Temple are located in heart of Padanilam.

=== Administrative history ===
Padanilam is located in Nooranad Grama Panchayath. The panchayath was formed on 30 December 1961. Before the formation of Alappuzha district, Nooranad was a part of Kollam district. At the time, a revenue division was formed with Nooranad as centre. It was named Nooranad subdistrict. When Alappuzha district was formed on 17 August 1957, Nooranad became a part of it.

== How to reach Padanilam ==
Padanilam is situated on Para (KP Road) - Edapppon-Pandalam (MC Road) road. It is about 17 km away from the town of Kayamkulam and about 10 km from the town of Pandalam. There are many private and KSRTC buses that run along this route. The buses through Padanilam ply from the private and KSRTC bus stands of Kayamkulam and Pandalam. There are buses from Pandalam, Kayamkulam, Pathanamthitta, Konni, Mavelikkara, Oachira, Karunagapally, etc., passing through Padanilam. It is situated on the Kayamkulam - Pandalam - Pathanamthitta bus route.

== Politics ==
Padanilam is situated in the Parliamentary and Assembly constituency of Mavelikkara. The current MP of the area is Kodikkunnil Suresh (INC) and the MLA is M.S.Arun Kumar (CPM). The LDF rules the Panchayat. There are 17 wards in the Panchayat. Communist Party of India, Communist Party of India (Marxist), Indian National Congress are major political parties in this area.

== Other specialities ==
The village is famous for its beautiful agricultural fields like Karingalichaal Puncha and Peruvelichal Puncha. Different varieties of birds can be found in this area. Because of this, Nooranad is known as the Pakshigraamam of Kerala, meaning "village of birds". The famous Sree Buddha College Of Engineering is situated in this village. A leprosy sanatorium is there in this village, which is first of its kind in Kerala and one of the largest in Asia. Currently, an Indo-Tibetan Border Police (ITBP) unit has started functioning in the sanatorium compound. One of the seventeen 220 kV substations of KSEB is located near Pattoor, the northernmost portion of the village. Interflora Worldwide Kerala Member Office is located in the town of Pandalam.

== Personalities ==
- Venad Sivankutty (Writer, Drama)
- Viswan Padanilam (novelist)
- Nooranad Pradeep (Drama Actor, writer, Director, dubbing artist.etc)
- Reji v Greenland (Book review writer, short story, poet)
- Edappon Ajikumar (Short story)
- Subees padanilam (Lyrics writer, music director and Video album director)
- Mrs.Sreeja Pillai (Poetess, Teacher. Hails from Padanilam, presently at Delhi)

== Nearby churches and temples ==
=== Temples ===
- Padanilam Parabrahma Temple, Padanilam Town.
- Vettadickal Devi Temple, Naduvilemuri
- Kulangaraveettil Sree Annapoorneshwari Temple, Nedukulanjimuri
- Kavil Sree Bhagavathi Temple
- Kulangara veettil Sree Annapoorneswari Temple, Padanilam
- Vadakkidathukaavu Devi Temple, Kidangayam
- Pallimukkom Devi Temple, Pattoor
- Kokkaatt Devi Temple, Naduvilemuri
- Muthukaattukara Devi Temple, Muthukaatukara
- Earezhathukaavu Devi Temple, Naduvilemuri
- Amabalathinaal Devi Temple, Edakkunnam
- Gurunaathankaavu Ardhanaareeswara Temple, Edappon
- Noorukodi Devi Temple, Palamel
- Plaakkodu Vaishnava Durga Temple, Powerhouse.
- Sreedharma Shastha Temple, Palamel-Kidangayam
- Vadasseril Sree Bhuvaneswari Sree Bhadrakaali Temple, Thathammunna
- Kannancheri Tharayil Mahavishnu Temple, Thathammunna
- Koombil Mala Maladeva Temple, Pulimel
- Amoomma Kaavu Temple, Pulimel
- Inchakkadu Devi Temple, Pulimel
- Kallekkal Temple, Pulimel
- Perumbral Devi Temple, Naduvilemuri
- Edayile Veetil Devi Temple, Pulimel
- Thathammunna Tharayil Bhagavathi Temple, Thathammunna
- Palamel-Kidangayam Sree DharmaShastha Temple (Travancore Dewasom Board)

=== Churches ===
- St:Thomas Orthodox Church Padanilam
- St:Bersouma orthodox church Attuva
- St. Sebastian Roman Catholic Church, Pulimel
- India Pentecostal Church of God (IPC)
- St. Theresas Malankara Syrian Catholic Church, Pattoor
- Fathima Matha church, Eliaz Nagar

== Photo gallery ==
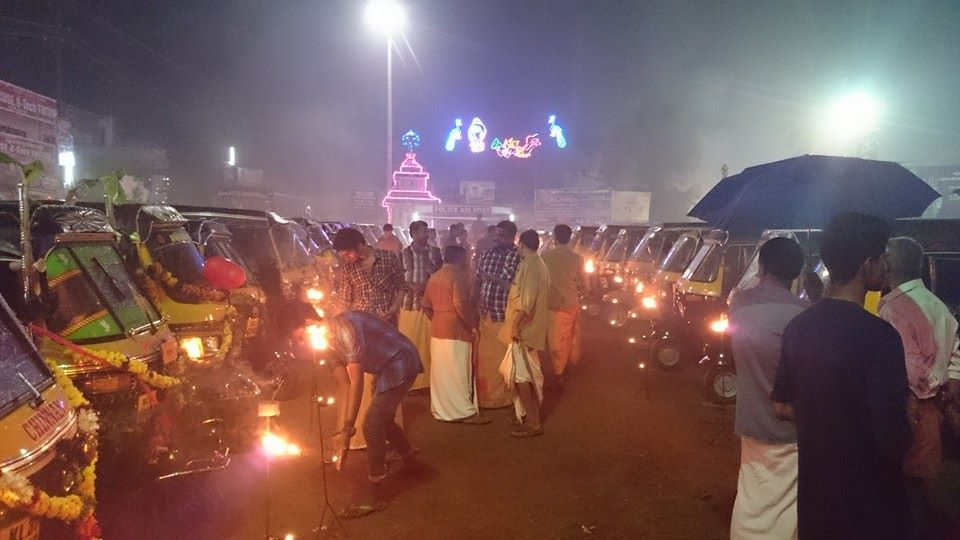
A picture taken during Vrischika Mahotsavam

== See also ==
- Mavelikkara
- Pandalam
- Kayamkulam
- Sabarimala
- Culture of Kerala
