= Kattanam =

- Village
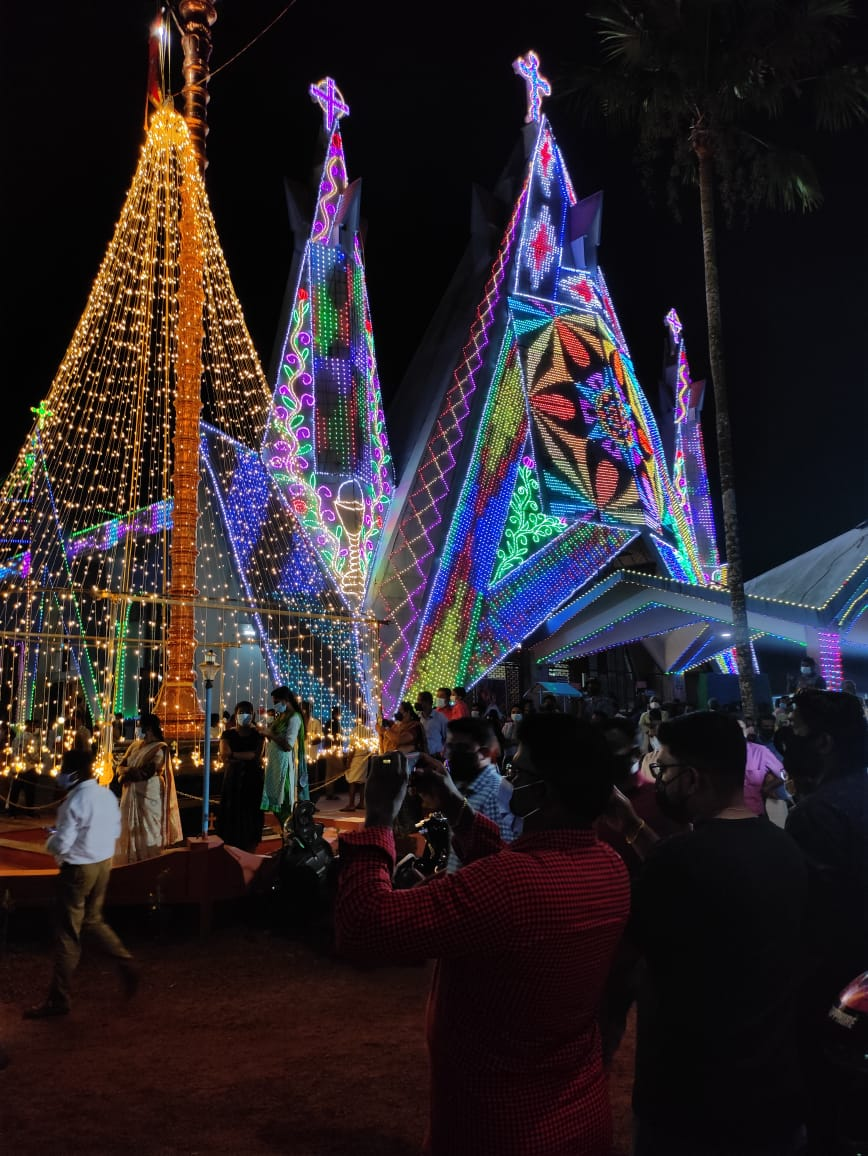
- Kattanam Valiyapally during Perunnal

- Location in Kerala, India Kattanam (India)
- Coordinates: 9.1764355°N 76.5641468°E
- Country: India
- State: Kerala
- District: Alappuzha

Government
  - Type: Gram Panchayat
  - Body: Bharanikkavu Gram Panchayat

Population (2011)
  - Total: 19,504

Languages
  - Official: Malayalam, English
- Time zone: UTC+5:30 (IST)
- PIN: 690503
- Telephone code: 0479
- Vehicle registration: KL 31
- Nearest city: Kayamkulam
- Literacy: 95.42%
- Lok Sabha Constituency: Alappuzha
- Kerala Legislative Assembly Constituency: Kayamkulam
- Climate: Tropical

Kattanam is a village located in Alappuzha district of the Indian state of Kerala. It is in the southern part of the country, 2,200 km south of the capital New Delhi. Kattanam is about 7.2 Km east of Kayamkulam, 10 Km South of Mavelikkara and 22 Km West of Adoor. Kattanam is located about 15 metres above sea level. Kattanam Junction is one of the main Junctions in the SH - 5 (Kayamkulam - Punalur Road).

Kattanam celebrates a lot of Cultural, Religious and Non-Religious festivals and programmes every year.

Kattanam is known for Saint Stephens Orthodox Syrian Church, a parish church under the Diocese of Mavelikkara of the Malankara Orthodox Syrian Church. The parish was established in 1835 and is the largest church in Kattanam, currently serving 8,000 members in over 1,200 families.

== Educational Institutions ==
Pope Pius XI Higher Secondary School is one of the main educational institutions situated in Kattanam. Other institutions are Mahatma English Medium School, St.Thomas Senior Secondary School, CMS High School, Model Public School.

== Places of Worship ==
Many religious institutions are situated at Kattanam. The Vetticode Nagaraja Temple is situated just 3 Km away from the Kattanam Junction.

The Orthodox Christian Church St. Stephen's Malankara Orthodox Syrian Church also known as Kattanam Valiyapalli is situated at the heart of Kattanam.

Other places of worship are, St. Stephen's Malankara Catholic Church, Bharanikkavu Devi Temple, Oorukkuzhi Devi Temple, St. Thomas Marthoma Church, Valiyaveedu Devi Temple, Sacred Heart Roman Latin Catholic Church, St. James CSI Church, and Mannadikkutti Devi Temple.

== See also ==
- Kayamkulam
- Mavelikkara
- Vallikunnam
- Charummoodu
- Pathiyoor
- Krishnapuram Palace
- Chettikulangara Devi Temple
- Bharanikkavu
- Oachira
