= Nooranad =

Nooranad Pakshi Gramam, Nandikesha Paithruka Gramam
- Town
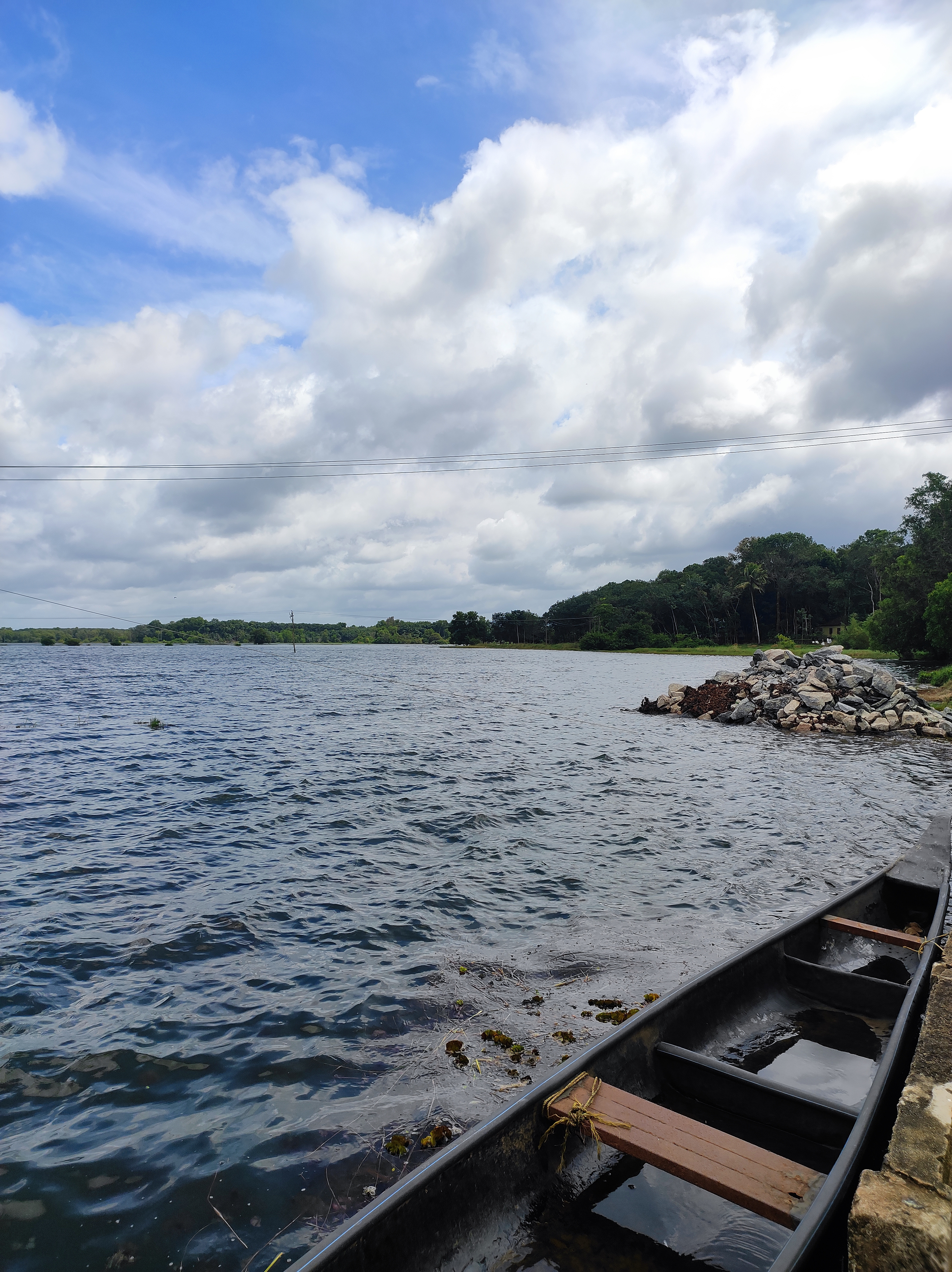
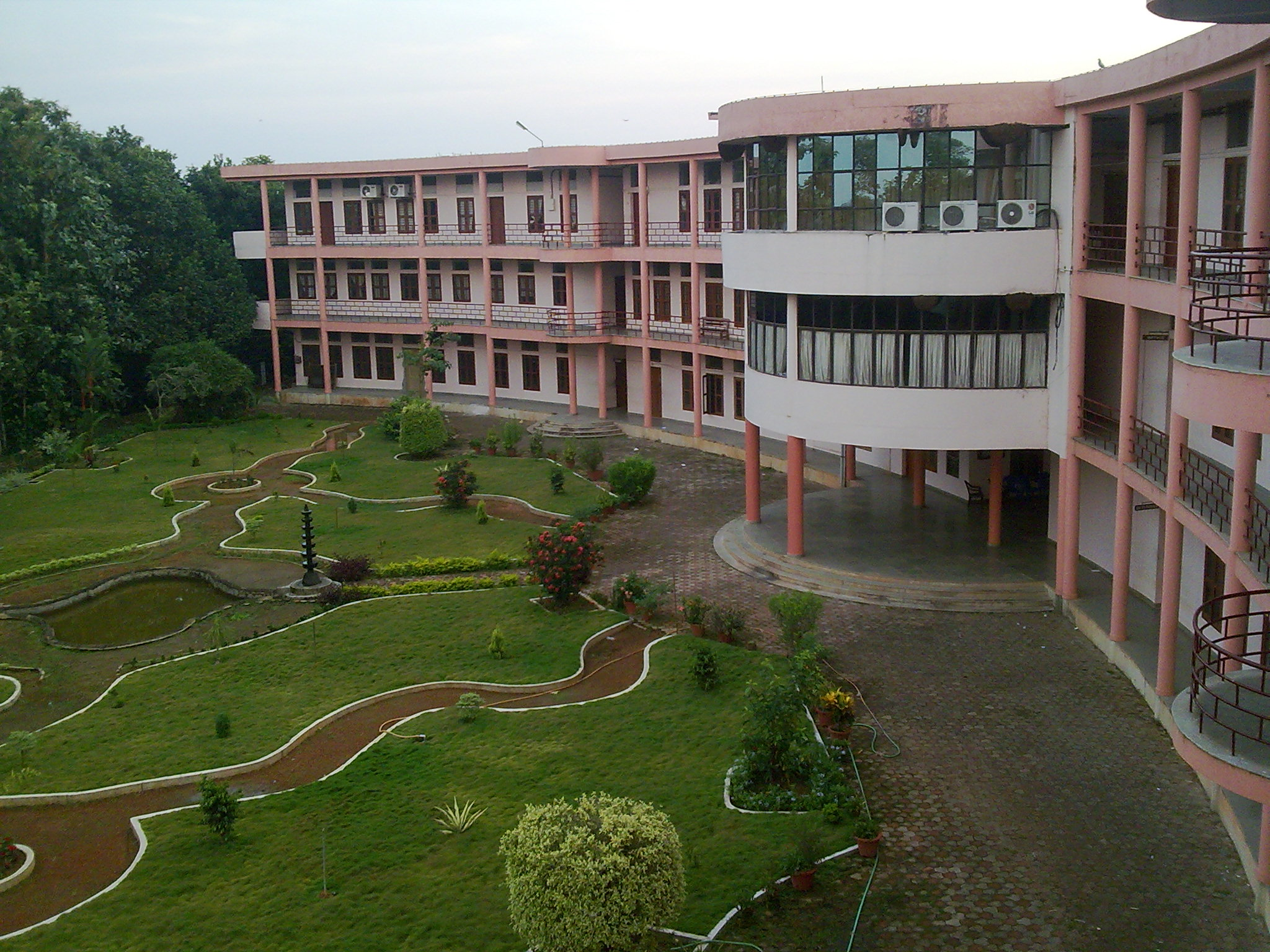
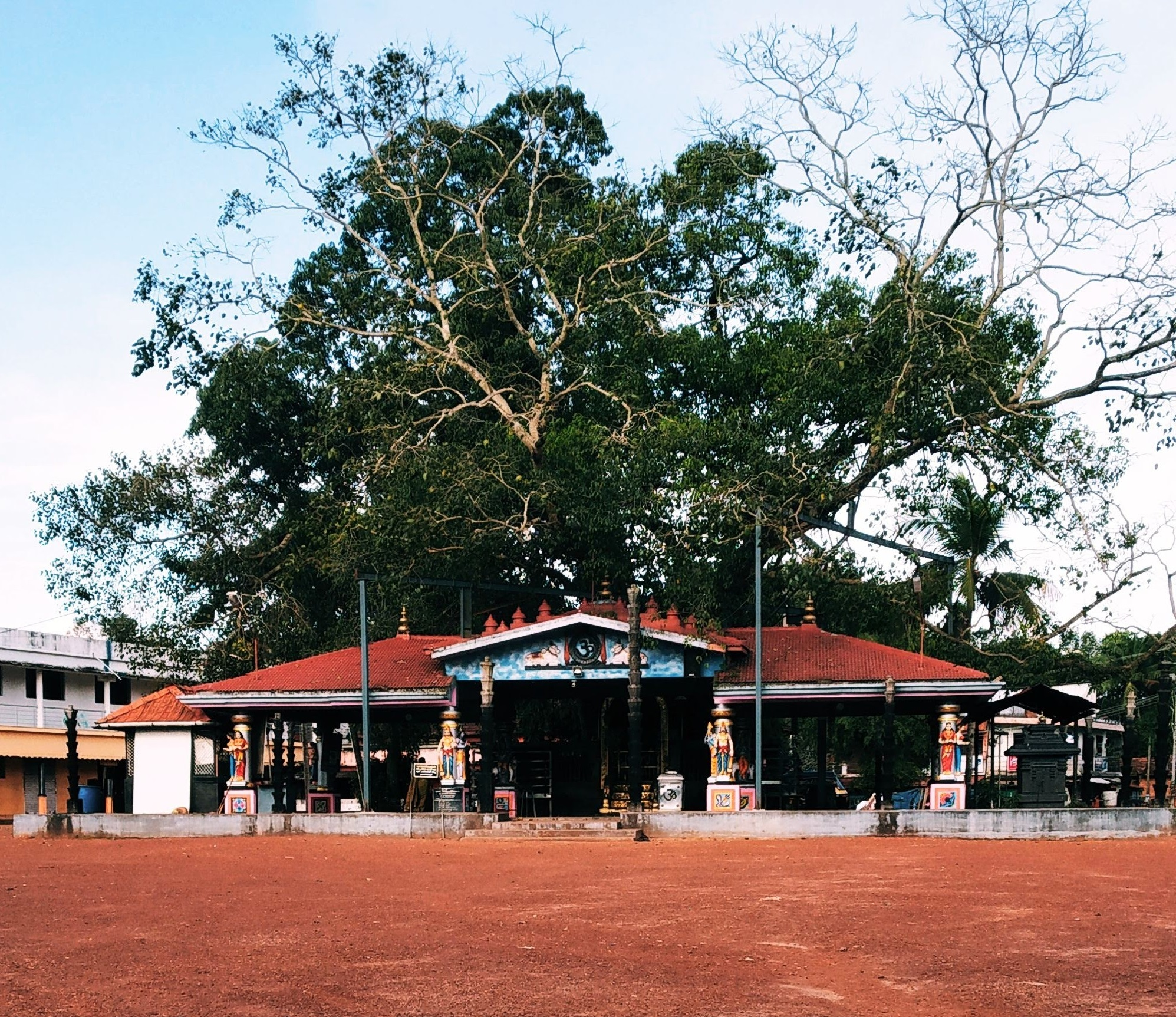
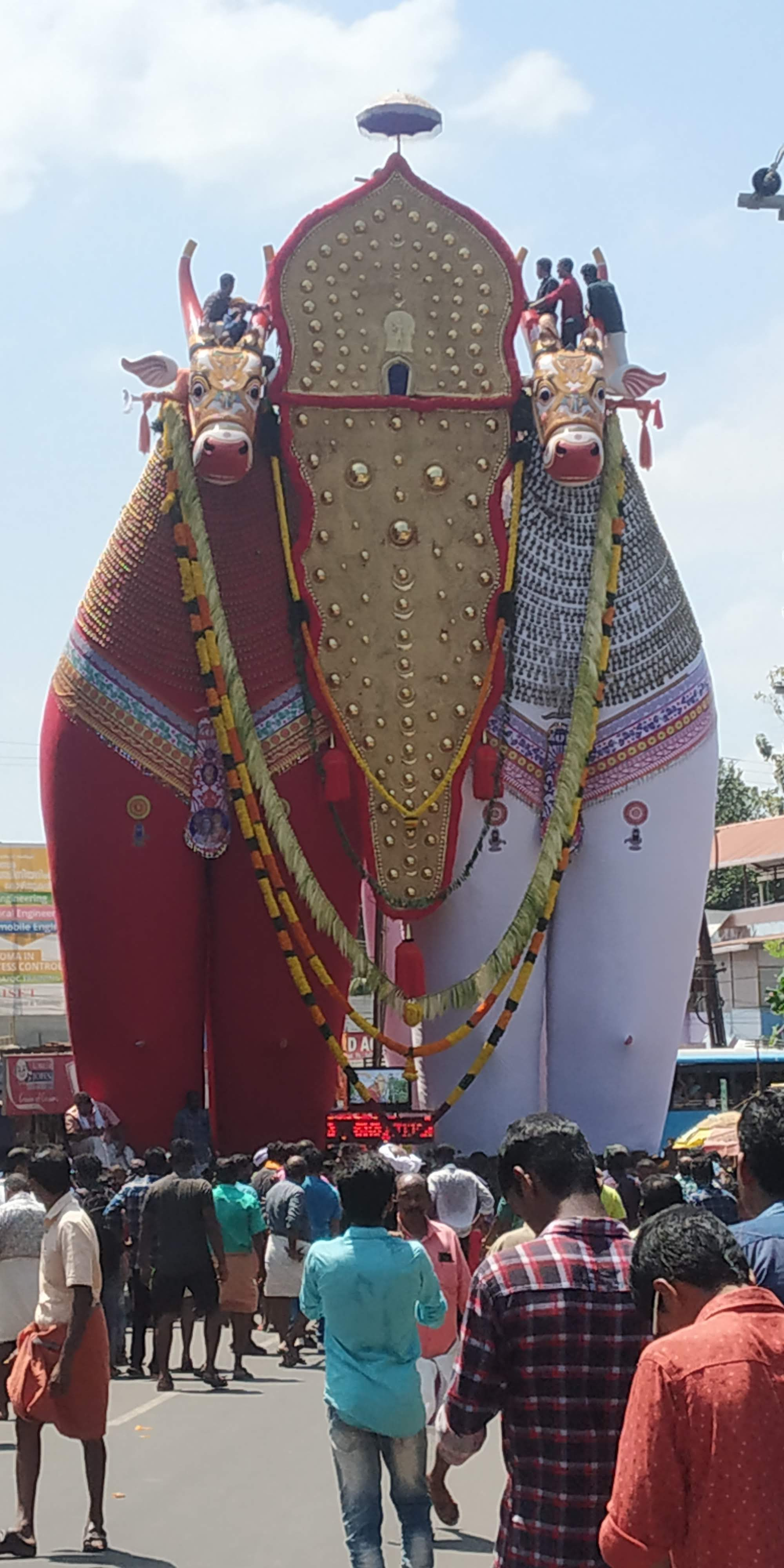
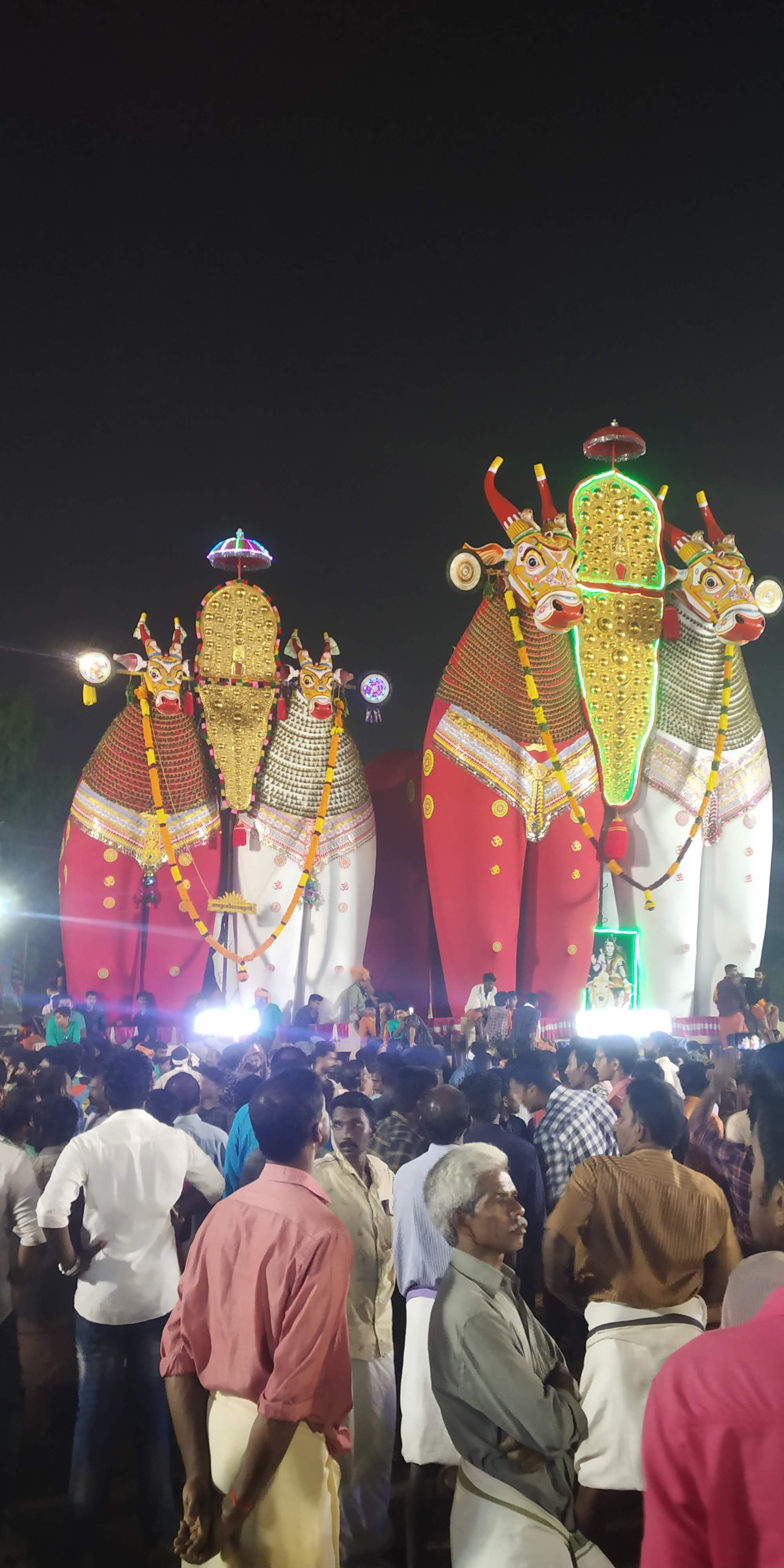
- From left to right : Karingalichal Wetlands, Sree Buddha College, Padanilam Parabrahma Temple, A huge kettukala in Padanilam Shivarathri, Crowd gathering for Shivarathri kettukazhcha.

- Location Nooranad in Kerala Location of Nooranad in India
- Coordinates: 9°12′25″N 76°37′55″E
- Country: India
- State: Kerala
- District: Alappuzha district

Government
  - Body: Grama Panchayath

Area
  - Total: 46.89 km^{2} (18.10 sq mi)

Population (2011)
  - Total: 25,375
  - Density: 541.2/km^{2} (1,402/sq mi)

Languages
  - Official: Malayalam, English
- Time zone: UTC+5:30 (IST)
- PIN: 690504, 690529.
- Vehicle registration: KL-31, KL-4
- Assembly constituency: Mavelikkara

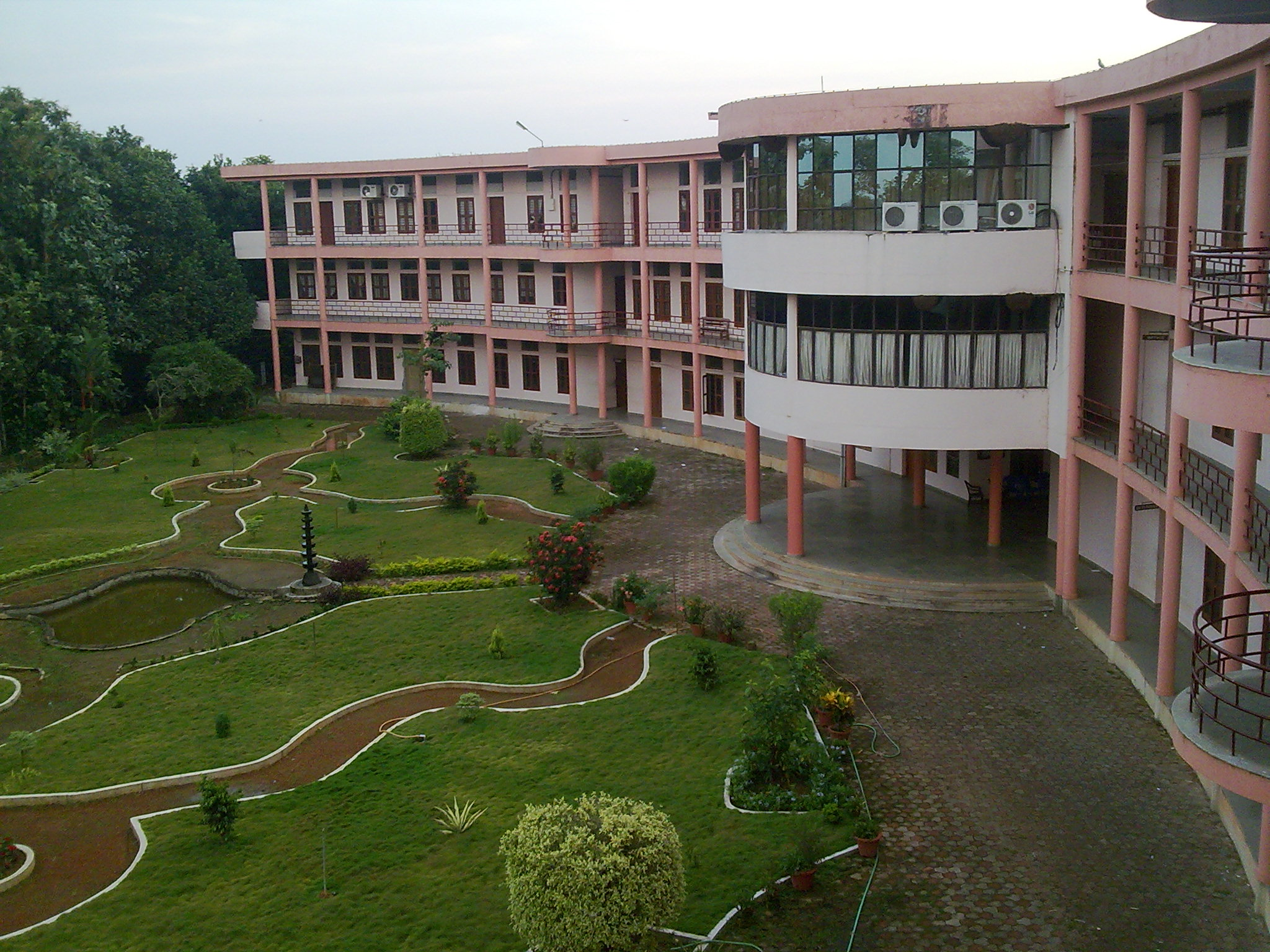
Sree Buddha College

Nooranad (also anglicized as Noornad or Nooranadu) is a developing town in Mavelikkara taluk of Alappuzha district in the Indian state of Kerala. It is located at a distance of 8 Km south-west of Pandalam, in Kayamkulam route. Padanilam is the cultural centre of Nooranad region. The Padanilam Parabrahma Temple, known for the biggest Shivarathri Kettukazhcha in Kerala, is situated in Nooranad. Nooranad is declared by the Government of Kerala as the Nandikesha Paithruka Gramam (Heritage Village of Nandikesha) due to its importance in Kettukala making, which is an icon of Onattukara region of Central Travancore. Nooranad is also known as Pakshi Gramam of Kerala.

== History ==
Nooranad was a part of Kollam district in the early days. A revenue division was formed in kollavarsham 1078 (1902) with Nooranad in Kollam district as its centre. It was known as Nooranad Sub district. At that time Nooranad was one of the most important cultural and trade center towards west of Adoor. Hundred revenue lands from Bharanikavu, Thamarakulam, Chunakkara, Palamel, Puddallur, Kulanada, Vallikunnam and several parts of Sooranad were merged and named as Noor Nadu (Hundred regions).

In the past there were two sub-registrar offices after Karunagappally: Nooranad and Mavelikara. The first Anchal office (Old post office in Travancore kingdom) in Nooranad was established by understanding the historical importance and extent of Nooranad sub-district. When Alappuzha district was formed on August 17, 1957, Nooranad was included in Mavelikkara taluk of Alappuzha district.

The Padanilam Parabrahma Temple that we see today was once an aalthara made of a few stones under a banyan tree. The current Edappon – Para road was just in front of the temple long ago. Padanilam is the administrative center of Nooranad and the resting place of Nooranad's history. The place got its name because the Karakkar (Small local divisions) used to fight for the right of the temple and led a battle. The army troops of Kayamkulam Kingdom (Onattukara) had camped near the temple for protecting the kingdom from the attack of neighbouring kings. During this period, the village had some chieftains and their supporters. They include Noorukodi Unnithans, Kadackal Kuruppans, Vettathasaans and Vettadickal Kuruppans.

Kayamkulam Raja withdrew his troops about four centuries ago. This initiated tensions between the chieftains for control of the village and the temple. Thus they divided into south and north, starting a fierce battle. The south side consisted of Noorukodi Unnithans and Kadackal Kuruppans. The north side had Vettathasans and Vettadickal Kuruppans with them. 22 karakal (small local divisions) supported their respective sides. During the battle, many soldiers on both sides died in large numbers. They were buried in the chira near the temple. The chira (Large pond) was used to bathe the Kayamkulam king's war horses at Nooranad Padanilam. Later it came to be known as Pottanchira.

The common people started worrying about the devastation of the battle and approached the Pazhoor Panamana Thampuran to find a solution to end the war. He tried to intervene but the parties were not in a position to stop. He made a tent in the eastern part of the temple and started fasting unto death. But that also did not deter the warring parties. But when he was on the verge of death due to the fast, they, fearing the Brahmanasaapam, agreed to stop war. They demarcated the boundary in the north-south direction and stopped the war in the name of Parabrahma, the presiding deity of the temple.

Hundreds of people used to earn their livelihood by doing agriculture and related jobs in Nooranad. It can be understood from the place names that the region had hills, valleys, thickets, big trees, creepers and wild animals (Example: Pulikunn, Pulimel, Thathamunna, Pannithadam, Kadamankulam, Mailadumkunn, Karimankav etc.).

Kayamkulam – Punalur Road (KP Road), as seen today was a very important royal road that passed through the center of Travancore. Just like today, travellers from Tamil Nadu, Karnataka etc. used this royal road to carry goods to and from various princely states. Another feature is that shade trees (chola trees) were planted on both sides of KP road to provide shade to the travellers, and there were load-sheds and wayside rest centers (inns) for the travellers to unload their heavy goods in those days when there were no vehicles like today. The trees that were planted that day can be seen on both sides of the road, still providing shade. These trees were planted during the reign of Sri Moolam Thirunal Maharaja. It was also on this route that Anchalotakkar (Old Post carriers) used to take posts from Nooranad to other places.

From Karingalippuncha (Karingalichal Wetland), in the eastern part of Nooranadu, there were no water routes after reaching Pallimukkam on the north side. So an artificial channel was cut and connected with the Peruvelippuncha (Peruvelichal Wetland) on the western side of Nooranad. This old water channel is came to be known as the Pandyan thodu.

== Geography ==
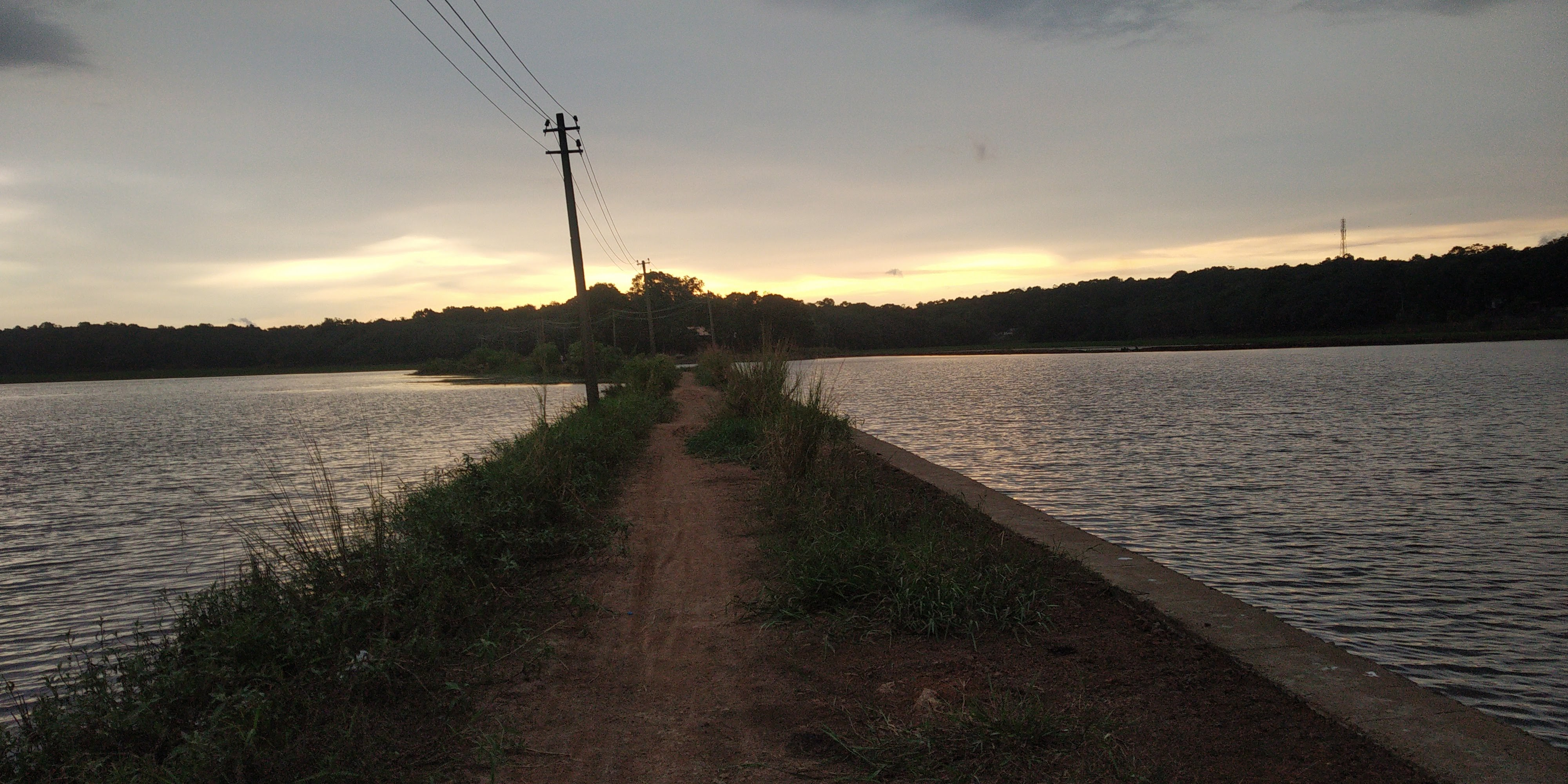
A bund road through Karingali Puncha

Nooranad region is located at the south-eastern edge of Alappuzha district. It shares its northern boundary with Chengannur Taluk in Alappuzha district itself, eastern boundary with Pandalam in Pathanamthitta district, and southern boundary with Kunnathur Taluk in Kollam district. Achankovil river flows through the northern boundary of Nooranad in westward direction. The Nooranad cultural region consists of Nooranad and Palamel Grama Panchayaths of Alappuzha district and part of Pallickal panchayath in Pathanamthitta district. Topographically, the village has 3 areas: small hills, slope regions and plain land. Laterite is the major soil type found here. Alluvium and loam soil types can be found in the low lying areas of Nooranad including plain lands. The Karingalichal wetlands in the north eastern portion of Nooranad is a large body of water connected to Achankovil river through Ayranikudy stream. It attracts a lot of migratory and other birds. Due to this, Nooranad is well known as the Pakshi gramam (Bird Village) of Kerala.

Peruvelichal is another wetland on the north-western area of Nooranad. It is also connected to Achankovil river through the Vettiyar bridge. Karingalichal and Peruvelichal wetlands has a large extent of cultivable land and forms a major part of the onattukara agricultural region.

== Padanilam Parabrahma Temple ==
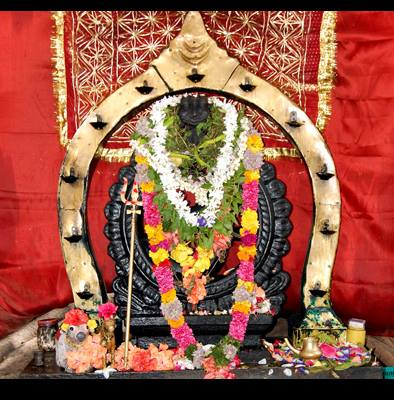
Parabrahma moorthy

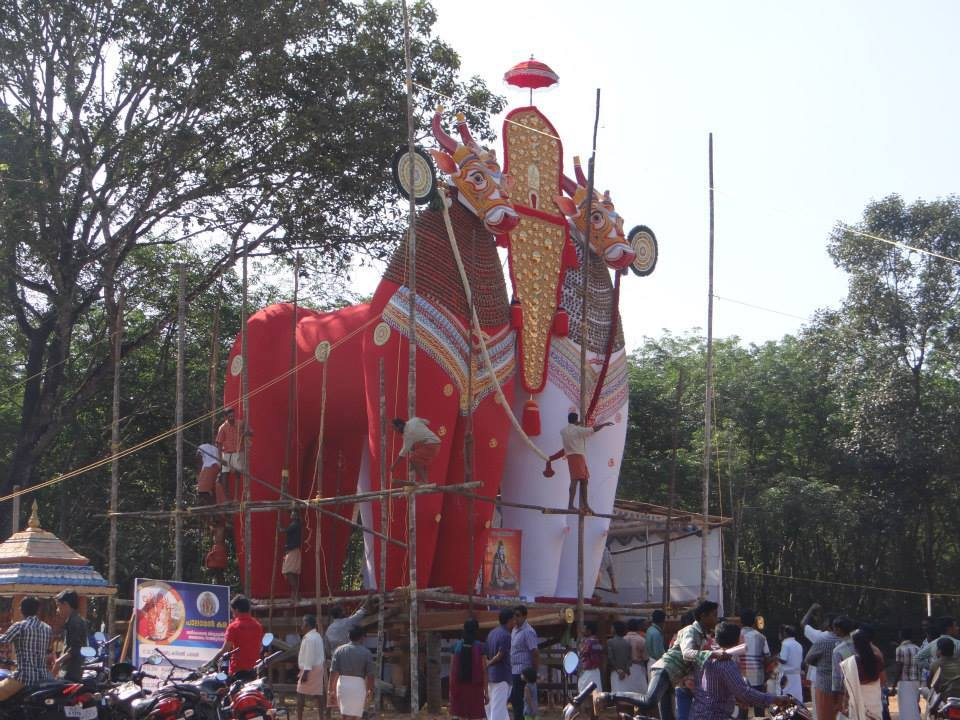
A kettukala (Palamel Kara) from Padanilam Shivarathri

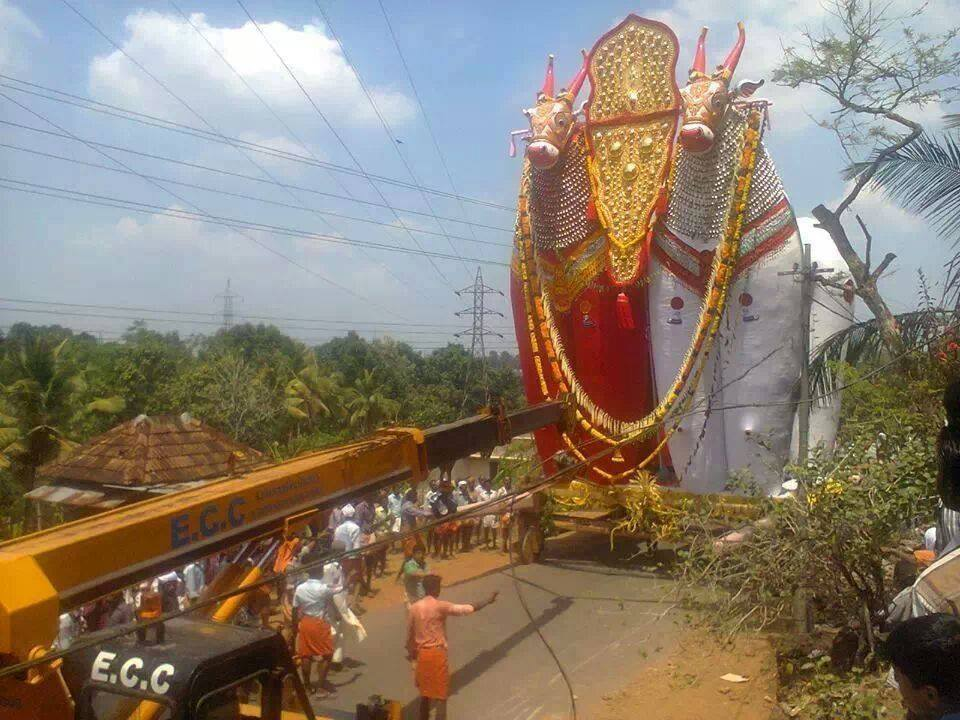
A huge nandikesh (Edappon Kara) from Padanilam Shivarathri

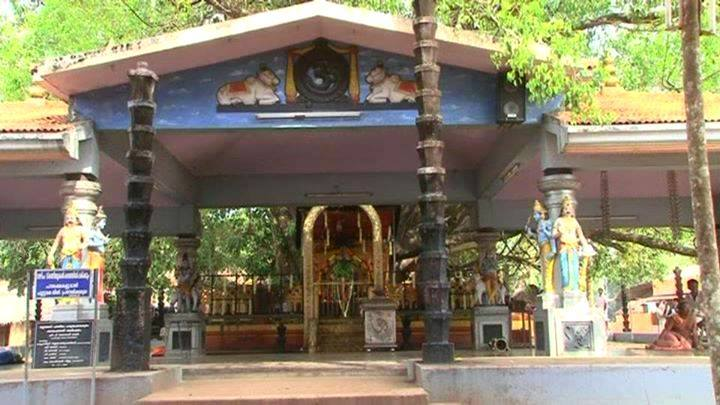
Padanilam Parabrahma Temple

The Padanilam Parabrahma Temple is one of the major temples in Kerala. The presiding deity of the temple is Lord Parabrahma. The temple is very much like the Oachira Parabrahma Temple. The temple has no compound walls and no roofs. A large number of festivals are celebrated here annually. The temple is one of the idathaavalam of Sabarimala Ayyappa Swami temple. There are KSRTC buses from Padanilam to Pamba during the Mandalam – Makaravilakku season. The temple has mainly 16 karakal (territories), who conduct the annual Sivarathri Festival. This is one of the biggest Nandikesha (ox vehicle of Lord Shiva) kettulsavams in Kerala. Other festivals in the temple include Irupathiyettaamonam (ഇരുപത്തിയെട്ടാം ഓണം), Vrischika Mahotsavam (വൃശ്ചിക മഹോത്സവം), kara chirapp (കര ചിറപ്പ്) khoshayathra, niraputhari (നിറപുത്തരി), Vidhyarambham (വിദ്യാരംഭം) etc.

During Irupathiyettam onam mahotsavam, arts clubs & self-help groups around Nooranad region bring festival floats, tableau and kettukazhcha to the temple. This festival is conducted on the Thiruvonam day of Malayalam month kanni. During Vrischika Mahotsavam, there will be a carnival and other associated cultural events. Devotees stay in huts made of coconut leaves within the temple compound itself for 12 days. Those devotees won't even visit their own house during these 12 days. Each day of the vrischika mahotsavam will have cultural programs and public conferences like Youth conference, agricultural conference, educational conference etc. Chief guests will be mostly experts in those corresponding fields or state ministers handling those respective portfolios. On 11th day, there is an event called vahanapooja. All the auto-taxi vehicles, trucks, tourist & stage carriage buses etc. in Nooranad will assemble in the temple compound for the vahana pooja. It's a spectacular sight. In the month of December, there is another event called chirapp Mahotsavam conducted by 16 karakal, 1 kara each day in a predetermined order. Grand processions (ഘോഷയാത്ര) are conducted during these 16 days with a competitive mindset between the karakal.

=== Temple Specialities ===
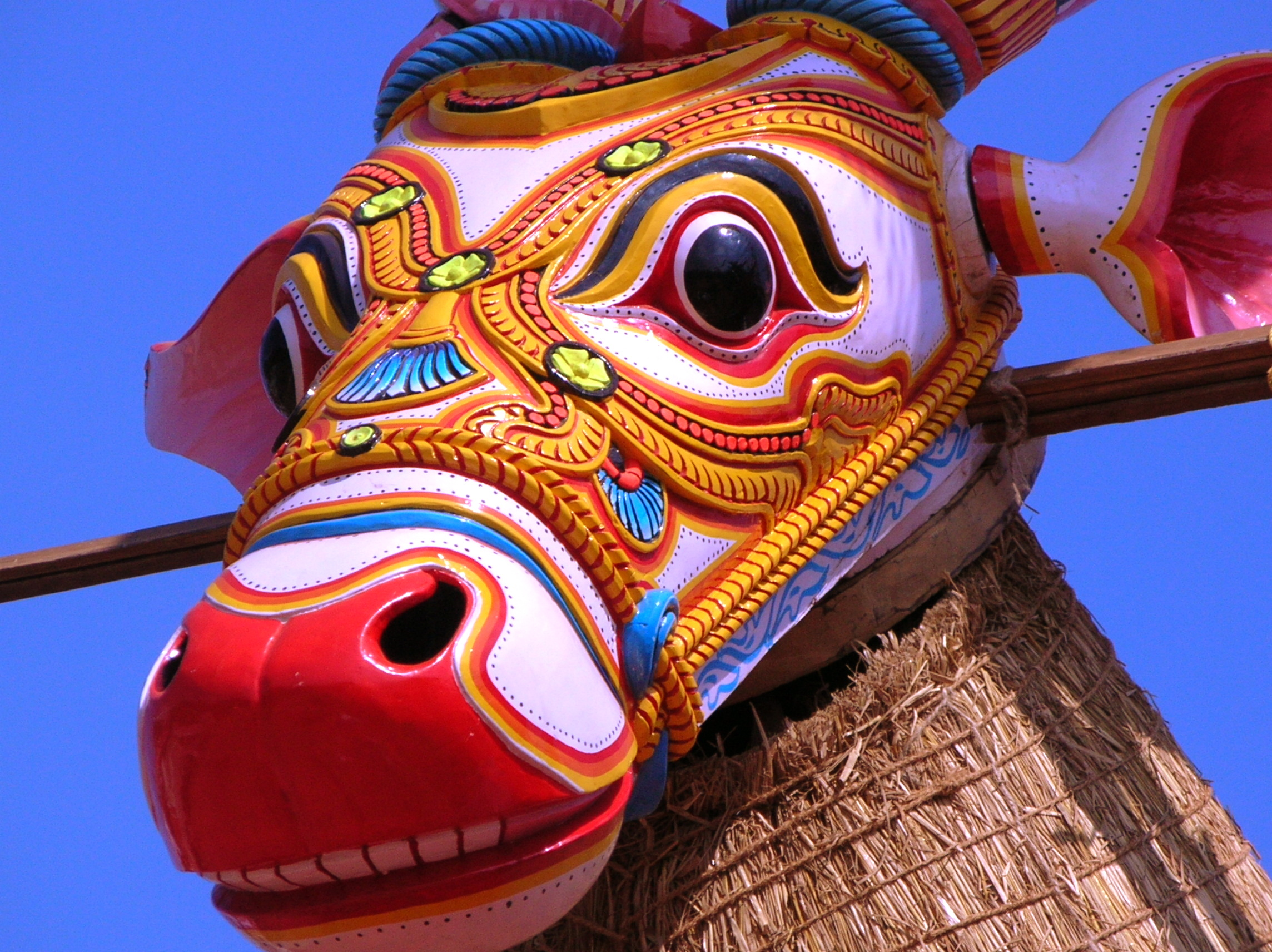
Decorated head of a Kettukala

- The temple has no protective walls or roofs
- The priests are not necessarily Brahmins.
- The temple neither opens nor closes. Rituals like Nada thurappu (opening of the temple in the dawn) and Nada adakkal (closing of the temple during night) are not performed at this temple.
- Non-Hindus are permitted to enter the temple and can even take part in all the celebrations related to temple including Shivarathri kettukazhcha.
- Vibhuti (holy ash) is given to devotees instead of Sandalwood paste.
- There is no proper idol in the temple. Only a stone image of OM and is placed under natural roof formed by tree leaves.
- Devotees can stay in the temple compound for the first 12 days of the month Vrischikam for doing bhajan for Lord Parabrahman. For this purpose special huts are made in temple premise and devotees lead a holy life these days.
- The temple is one of the Idathaavalam of Sabarimala Dharma Sastha Temple.The temple provides resting place for Ayyappa devotees coming from various places. Many Pamba special service buses are passing through Padanilam. Temple authority is providing dried ginger coffee and light food for Sabarimala devotees.
- Many marriages are also conducted in this temple, because marriage in this temple is considered auspicious by local people.

== Padanilam Shivarathri ==
Sivarathri is the main festival in Padanilam Parabrahma temple. Giant effigies of bulls, known locally as kettukala, are pulled to the temple from 18 territories (kara) of the temple. Some of these have a height of more than 50 feet. Its one of the largest festivals of its kind in Kerala. There are many people in the Nooranad area, who are involved in the making of these colossal effigies. Due to this, Kerala Government recognized Nooranad as the Nandikesha Paithruka Gramam Thousands come to the temple on Sivarathri day to see the kaavadiyattam for Lord Subrahmanyan in the morning. Kaavady from all parts of the area come separately and meet at the temple. Kettulsavam is the most spectacular sight of the festival and is held in the evening. Kettulsavam from the distinct areas of the village come to the temple at around 4 p.m. The rituals and programmes only end at next day midnight.

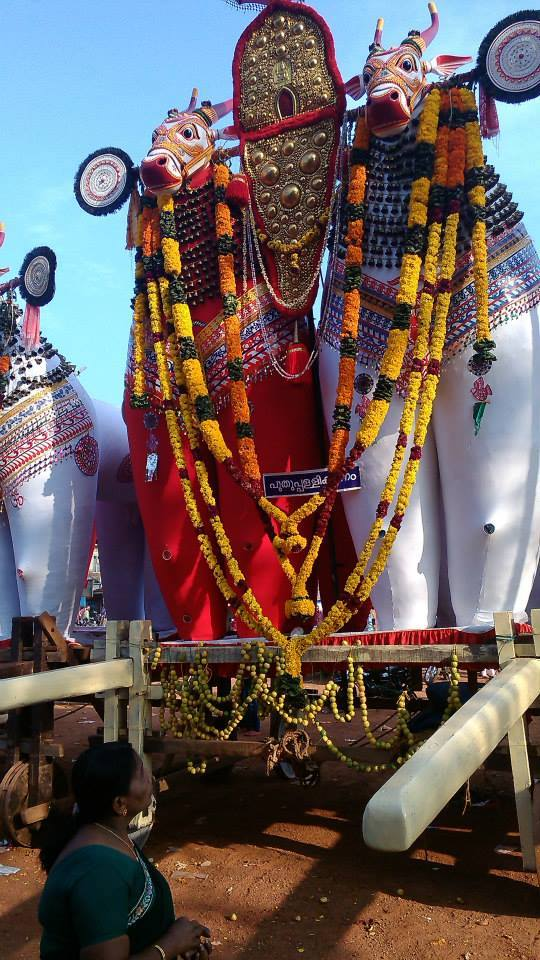
A typical Onattukara kettukala (Puthuppallikunnam Kara)

== Administration ==
Nooranad region is spread mainly across 2 panchayaths: Nooranad Panchayath & Palamel panchayath. Office of Nooranad Grama Panchayath is situated near Padanilam Junction and that of Palamel panchayath at Erumakkuzhy (Nooranad Town). Nooranad panchayath has 17 wards spreading across an area of 21.29 square kilometers. Palamel panchayath has an area of 25.6 square kilometers and have 19 wards.

== Demographics ==
As per 2011 India Census, Nooranad had a total population of 25375 people with 11511 males and 13864 females. The two panchayaths together have 15,455 households.

== Politics ==
Nooranad is situated in the Parliamentary and Assembly constituency of Mavelikkara. The current MP of the area is Kodikunnil Suresh (INC) and the MLA is M. S. Arun Kumar (CPM). The LDF rules the two Panchayats in the region. Communist Party of India, Communist Party of India (Marxist), Indian National Congress and Bharatiya Janata Party are the major political parties in this area.

== Transport ==
=== Road ===
Nooranad is well connected to the rest of the state through a network of major roads. National Highway 183 (Kollam – Theni NH) passes through Charummoodu Junction situated at the western end of Nooranad panchayath. The old royal road KP Road connects Nooranad with NH 66 at Kayamkulam, MC Road (SH 1) at Adoor and Main Eastern Highway (SH 8) at Pathanapuram. 10th Mile – Pandalam road connects Nooranad with Pandalam Municipality and is a shortcut to reach MC Road. The Harippad – Pathanamthitta district road passes through Edappon Junction in the northern part of Nooranad panchayath. This road runs parallel to the Achankovil river and gets submerged under water during heavy rains. Para Junction – Edappon road connects KP Road with Harippad – Pathanamthitta road and it passes through Padanilam Junction.

=== Rail ===
The major railway station near Nooranad is Kayamkulam Junction railway station, which is about 16 Km west of Nooranad town. Mavelikkara railway station is located about 14 Km north-west of Padanilam Junction. Chengannur railway station is about 18 Km north of Padanilam Junction.

The proposed Silver Line (K-Rail) alignment passes right through the centre of Nooranad region, between Kollam and Chengannur stations.

=== Air ===
The region of Nooranad is served by the Thiruvananthapuram International Airport, which is about 105 kilometers south of the town via MC Road. Cochin International Airport is situated at a distance of 146 Km in the northern direction via NH 66.

== Education ==
Nooranad region has a number of schools and colleges which provide a great platform for higher education. CBM HSS is the most prominent school in this area, which is an aided school located about 1 Km east of Nooranad Junction alongside KP Road. Padanilam HSS is another important government school in the locality, which is situated in close proximity with Padanilam Parabrahma Temple. Sree Buddha College of Engineering is an NBA accredited professional higher educational institution located at Nooranad Pattoor. Josco College of Nursing is located at Edappon, alongside Harippad – Pathanamthitta road. The Kuriakose Chavara Mission (KCM) school of Nursing is located adjacent to KCM hospital, about 1.5 Km west of Nooranad Junction.

=== Major schools ===
- CBM Higher Secondary School, Erumakkuzhy
- Padanilam Higher Secondary School
- Government VHSS, Thandanuvila, Kudassanad
- Government LP School, Palamel, Padanilam
- Sree Buddha Central School, Pattoor
- St. Stephens Public School, Kudassanad
- Fathima Matha English Medium School, Elias Nagar
- Sree Sabari Central School, Panayil
- St. Joseph's Convent English Medium School, Parayankulam
- Harisree English Medium School, Pallimukk
- Government High School, Edappon
- Government LP School, Kuthirakettumthadam
- Government UP School, Edakkunnam
- Government LP School, Cherumukha
- Government LP School, Kudassanad
- APM LP School, Parayankulam
- Government Welfare LPS, Payyanalloor
- St. Bursoma's School, Ayiranikudy

== Healthcare ==
Major healthcare institutions in Nooranad include:

- Josco Multi-specialty Hospital, Edappon
- KCM Hospital, Thathamunna
- Government Sanatorium (Oolanpara Hospital), LSPO
- Nooranad Family Health Centre, Padanilam
- Government Public Health Centre, Ulavukkad
- Mar Baselious Health Care Clinic, Kudassanad

== Karingalichal Wetlands ==
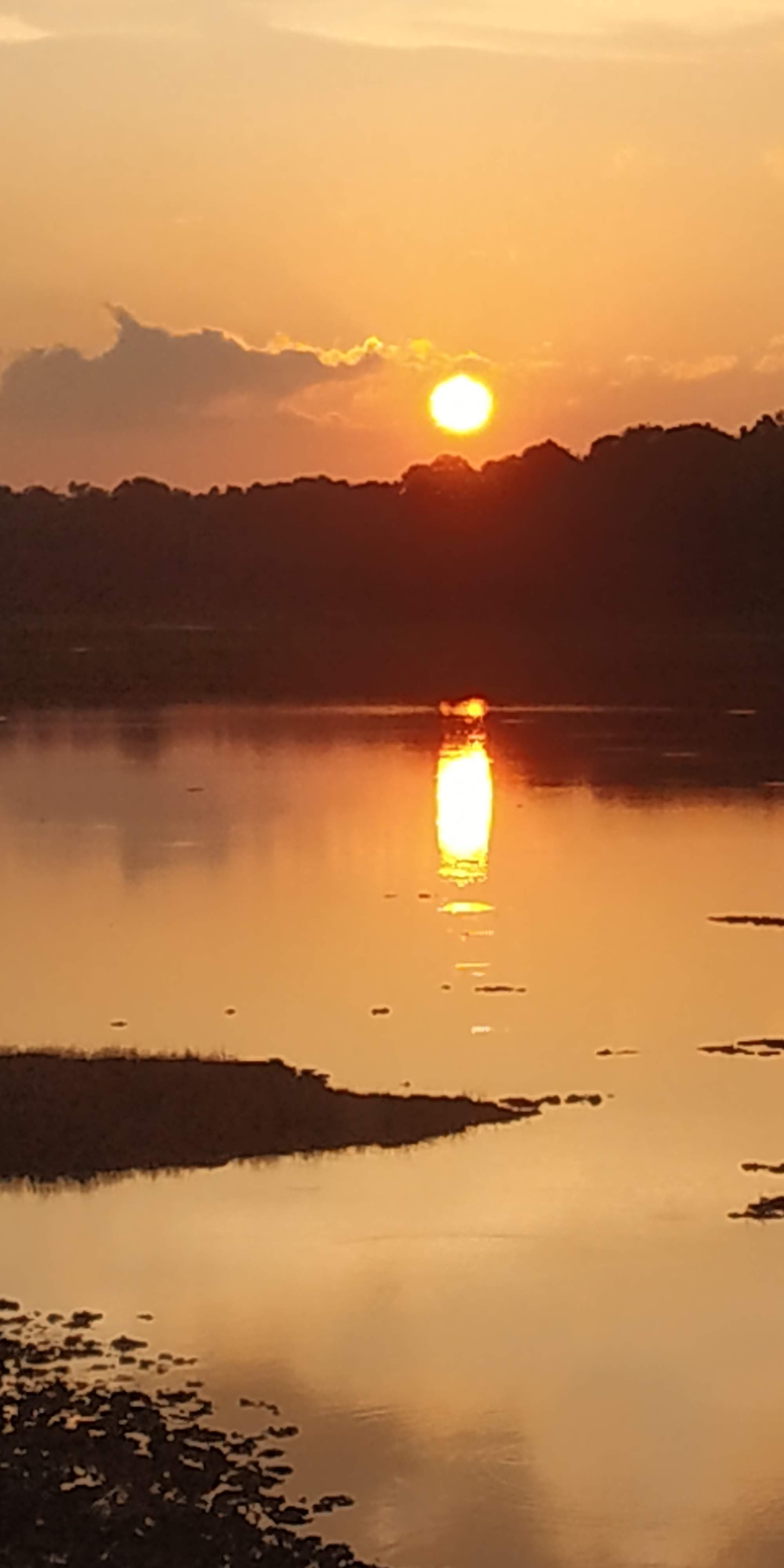
A view of evening sun from Mukkom Bund in Karingalichal

The vast Karingalichal wetland (Karingali Puncha) is the main reason why Nooranad gets the title of Kerala's bird village (Pakshi Gramam). Covering an area of over 13 square kilometers, it is a beautiful area filled with paddy fields, streams, deep pools and swamps. Karingali puncha is spread across Nooranad & Palamel panchayats and Pandalam municipality of Pathanamthitta district. This area is the rice bowl of Onattukara. The paddy fields here are cultivated mainly for 4 months from December to April. To help this, water is released from Thenmala Dam through the right bank canal of Kallada Irrigation Project (KIP). Water reaches Karingalichal from the main canal through several sub-canals. Water from Achankovil river also reaches Karingalichal through the Ayranikuzhi bridge in the north. This causes the water level to rise significantly during periods of heavy rainfall.

Nooranad is a paradise for bird watchers. Many species of birds including migratory birds can be seen here. Nooranad became famous among bird watchers through a report published in 1988 by prominent bird watcher Shri P. K. Uthaman in the Journal of The Bombay Natural History Society. Great Egret, Little egret, Siberian stonechat, Alpine swift, Eurasian Marsh Harrier, Indian Pitta, Oriental Darter, brown backed needletail, Black headed ibis, Red-wattled Lapwing and several hundreds of bird species can be seen here. Tourism activities like Kuttavanchi Savari is also happening by making use of the vast area of water.

== Other Specialities ==
A leprosy sanatorium is there in Nooranad, which is first of its kind in Kerala and one of the largest in Asia. Currently, an Indo-Tibetan Border Police (ITBP) unit has started functioning in the sanatorium compound. One of the seventeen 220 kV substations of KSEB is located near Pattoor, the northernmost portion of the village.

== Notable people ==
- P. Prasad – Member, Legislative Assembly (Cherthala), Kerala.Minister for Agriculture. Former Chairman Kerala Housing Board. Orator and writer.
- Pramod Narayan Member Legislative Assembly, Kerala
- Aburaj B Director. State Institute of Educational Technology, Government of Kerala
