= Puthuppally =

Puthuppally may refer to

- Puthuppally, Alappuzha, Kerala, India
- Puthuppally, Kottayam, Kerala, India
