= Dionysus Michael =

Metropolitan Bishop His Grace Mor Dionysus Michael
- Born: 15 June 1879; Kayamkulam
- Died: 18 January 1956 (aged 76); St. Mary’s Jacobite Syrian Church, Panampady
- Major shrine: Kadeesa Jacobite Syrian Church, Kayamkulam; St. Mary's Jacobite Syrian Church, Panampady
- Feast: 18 January
- Patronage: Jacobite Syrian Orthodox Church
- Influences: Municipal Councillor of Sreemulam Praja Sabha; Diocese Metropolitan of Quilon, Niranam, and Thumpamon

Mor Dionysus Michael (15 June 1879 – 18 January 1956) was a bishop of the Malankara Jacobite Syrian Orthodox Church.

== See also ==
- Malankara Church
- Jacobite Syrian Orthodox Church
