= Charummood =

Charummood Charummoodu
- Town
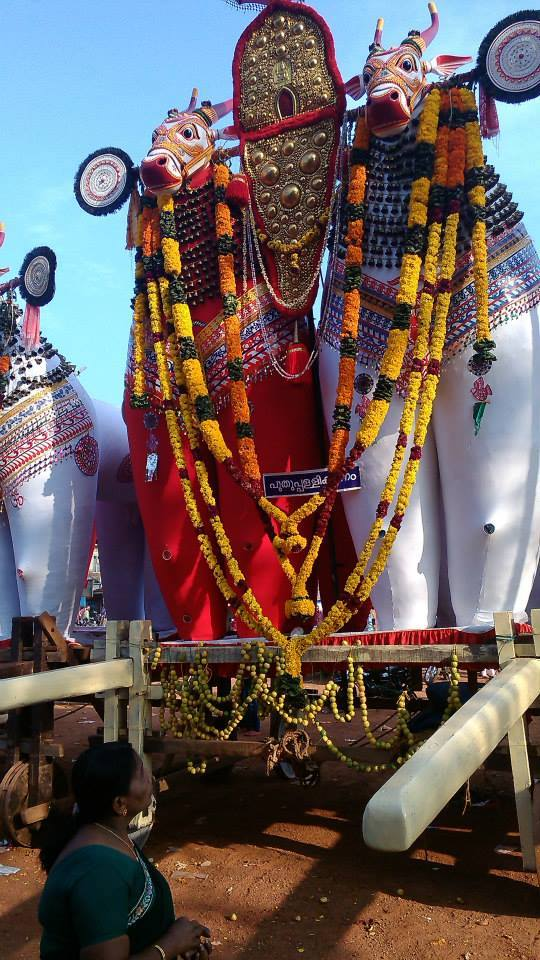
- Kettukala from Charummoodu at Padanilam

- Location in Kerala, India
- Coordinates: 9.172371°N 76.608055°E
- Country: India
- State: Kerala
- District: Alappuzha

Government
  - Type: Panchayath

Area
  - Total: 14 km^{2} (5.4 sq mi)

Languages
  - Official: Malayalam, English
- Time zone: UTC+5:30 (IST)
- PIN: 690 505
- Telephone code: 0479
- Vehicle registration: KL-31 (Mavelikkara)
- Sex ratio: 1145 ♂/♀
- Literacy: 96.31%

Charummood (also spelled Charummoodu) is a town in Mavelikkara taluk of Alappuzha district in Kerala, India. Charummood is 12 km east of the nearest town Kayamkulam, 15 km west of Adoor and 12 km south of Mavelikkara. Charummood Junction is at the intersection of KP Road (Kayamkulam- Punalur Road) and NH 183 (Kollam - Theni Highway). The Vetticode Nagaraja Temple is located 4 kilometres from Charummood. Chunakkara Thiruvayiroor Mahadevar temple, also located 4 km from Charummood, is famous for sarvam swayambhoo deity and its festival is the first main festival of the Onattukara area. Chunakkara Aarattu & Padanilam Parabrahma Temple, which is famous for its Sivarathri festival, is about 5 kilometers from Charummood.

== Location ==
Charummoodu is located at the border of the Thamarakkulam, Nooranad and Chunakkara Panchayaths and the second largest town in the Mavelikkara Taluk. There is a proposal to form Charummoodu Panchayath by joining parts of Chunakkara, Nooranad and Thamarakkulam panchayaths.

== Places of worship ==
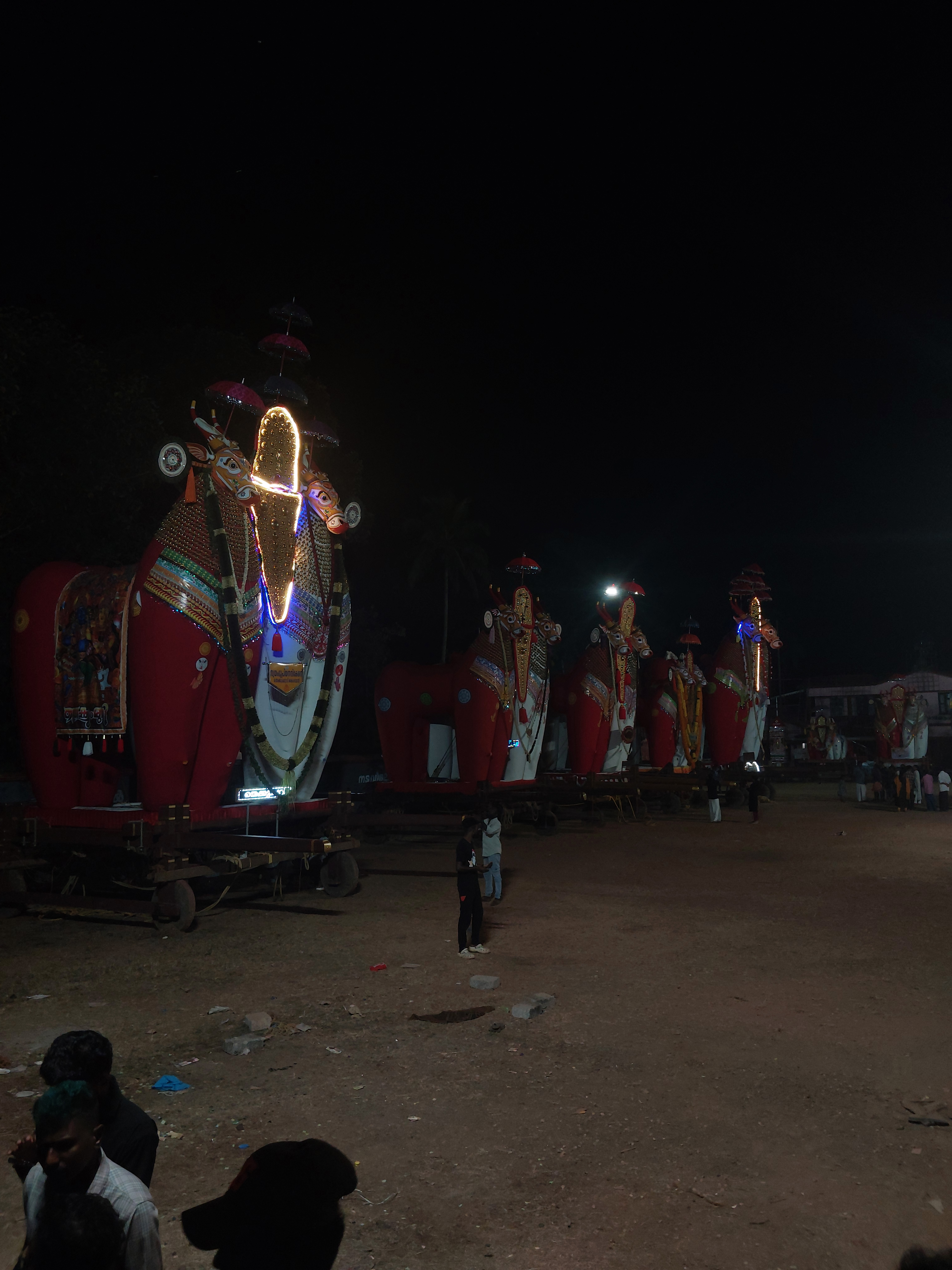
Chunakkara Kettukazcha

Hindu: The main temples near Charummood are Vetticode Nagaraja Swami temple, Chunakkara Mahadevar temple, Padanilam Parabrahma temple etc.

Christian: St Joseph's Convent and St Mary's Syro-Malankara Catholic Church are located near the centre of the town.

Muslim: The main mosque is Chunakara South Muslim-Jamaath.

== Healthcare ==
Nearby hospitals are SN Hospital and St. Thomas Mission Hospital

== Notable people ==
- O. Madhavan – playwright, director, social activist, drama, doctor.
