= Arookutty =

- village
- Location in Kerala, India
- Coordinates: 9°52′19″N 76°19′43″E
- Country: India
- State: Kerala
- District: Alappuzha

Population (2001)
  - Total: 17,387

Languages
  - Official: Malayalam, English
- Time zone: UTC+5:30 (IST)
- PIN: 688535
- Telephone code: 0478
- Vehicle registration: KL-32
- Lok Sabha constituency: Alappuzha
- Niyamasabha constituency: Aroor

Arookutty is a census town in Alappuzha district in the state of Kerala, India.

== Demographics ==
As of 2001 India census, Arookutty had a population of 17,387. Males constitute 50% of the population and females 50%. Arookutty has an average literacy rate of 80%, higher than the national average of 59.5%; with 53% of the males and 47% of females literate. 11% of the population is under six years of age. It is the northern tip of a beautiful peninsula by the name Karappuram surrounded by vembanad lake in three sides.

Year	Male	Female	Total Population	Change	Religion (%)							
Year	Male	Female	Total Population	Change	Hindu	Muslim	Christian	Sikhs	Buddhist	Jain	Other religions and persuasions	Religion not stated
2001	8614	8779	17393	-	55.92	39.84	4.19	0.00	0.01	0.01	0.00	0.03
2011	9650	9761	19411	11.60%	51.21	44.56	4.13	0.00	0.01	0.00	0.00	0.10

Arookutty My Village, a documentary on the history of Arookutty, was published in 2012.

The nearest major railway station is Ernakulam Junction and the nearest airport is Cochin International Airport.

Cherthala - Arookutty road runs parallel to National Highway 47. Nearest Railway Station Aroor Railway Station.
