= Thuravoor Thekku =

- village
- Interactive map of Thuravoor Thekku
- Country: India
- State: Kerala
- District: Alappuzha

Population (2011)
  - Total: 28,802

Languages
  - Official: Malayalam, English
- Time zone: UTC+5:30 (IST)
- Vehicle registration: KL-04, KL-32
- Lok Sabha constituency: Alappuzha
- Vidhan Sabha constituency: Aroor

Thuravoor Thekku is a village in Alappuzha district in the Indian state of Kerala. Thuravoor lies between the towns of Alappuzha and Kochi along the NH 47.

== Administration ==
Thuravoor panchayat falls under the Aroor Assembly constituency and the Alappuzha Parliamentary constituency.

== Demographics ==
As of 2011 India census, Thuravoor Thekku had a population of 28802 with 13915 males and 14887 females.
