= Kanjikkuzhi =

Kanjikuzhi
- Town
- Interactive map of Kanjikuzhi
- Coordinates: 9°45′0″N 76°36′0″E
- Country: India
- State: Kerala
- District: Kottayam

Government
  - Body: Nagar Palika

Population (2012)
  - Total: 14,076

Languages
  - Official: Malayalam, English
- Time zone: UTC+5:30 (IST)
- Vehicle registration: KL05

Kanjikuzhi is a census town in Kottayam district in the Indian state of Kerala. It is a suburb of Kottayam City. It lies on the Kottayam - Kumily state highway (K.K road).

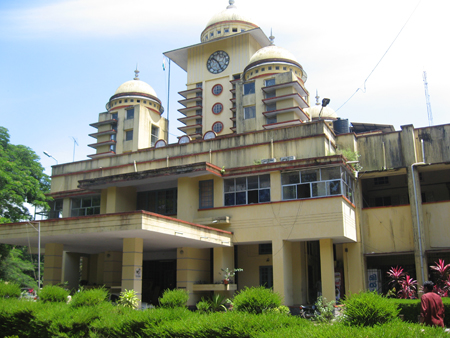
Kottayam collectorate near Kanjikuzhi

== Demographics ==
According to the 2011 India census, Kanjikuzhi had a population of 14,076. Males constituted 49% of the population and females 51%. Kanjikuzhi had an average literacy rate of 86%, higher than the national average of 59.5%: male literacy was 88% and female literacy was 84%. 10% of the population were under 6 years of age.
