= Palamel =

Palamel Erumakkuzhy
- village
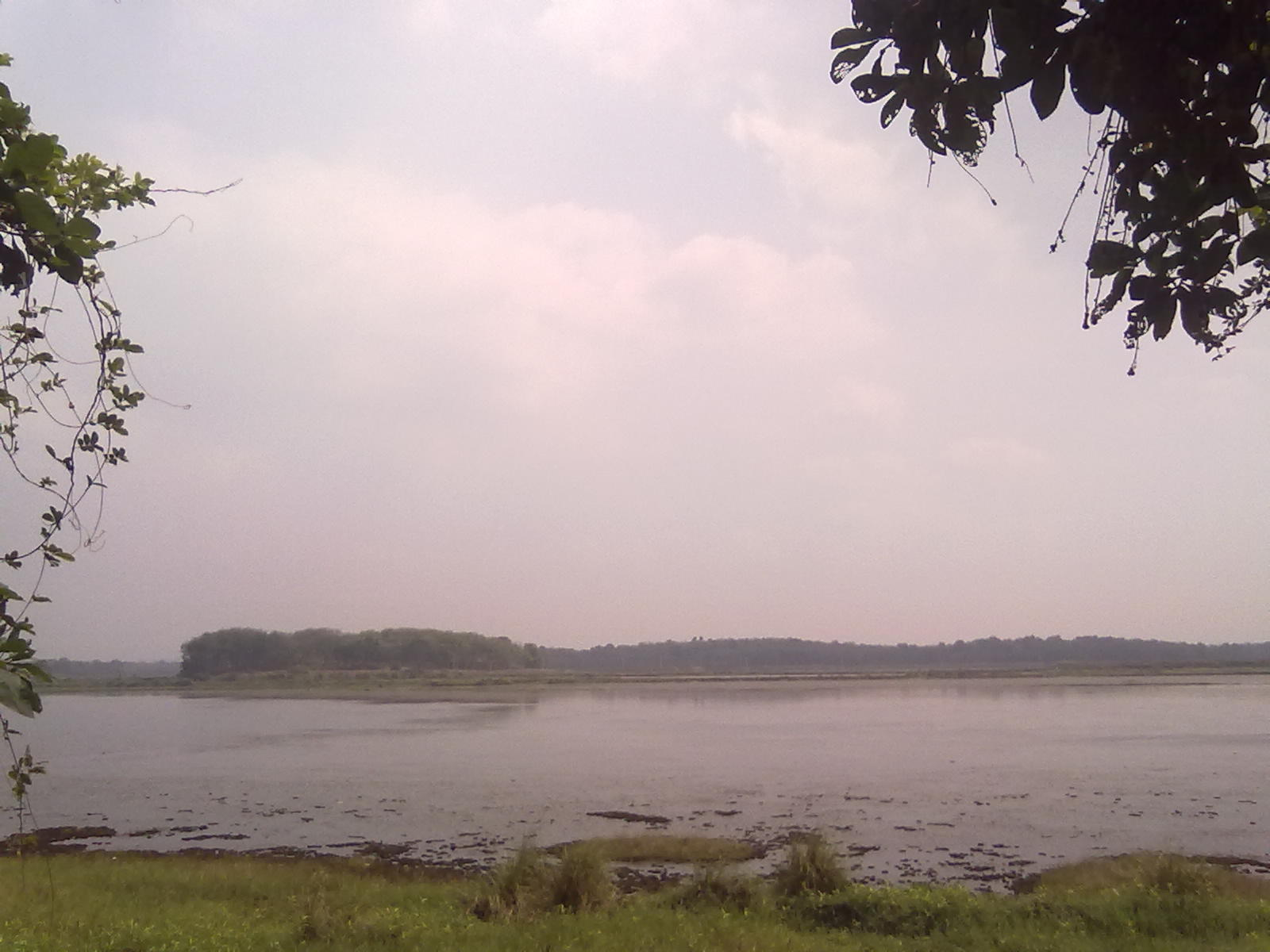
- Karingali Lagoon
- Interactive map of Palamel
- Coordinates: 9.1874900°N 76.649770°E
- Country: India
- State: Kerala
- District: Alappuzha

Government
  - Body: Panchayat

Population (2011)
  - Total: 32,512

Languages
  - Official: Malayalam, English
- Time zone: UTC+5:30 (IST)
- PIN: 690504
- Telephone code: 0479
- Vehicle registration: KL 31
- Pandalam: Kollam
- Lok Sabha constituency: Mavelikkara
- Vidhan Sabha constituency: Mavelikkara
- Civic agency: Panchayat

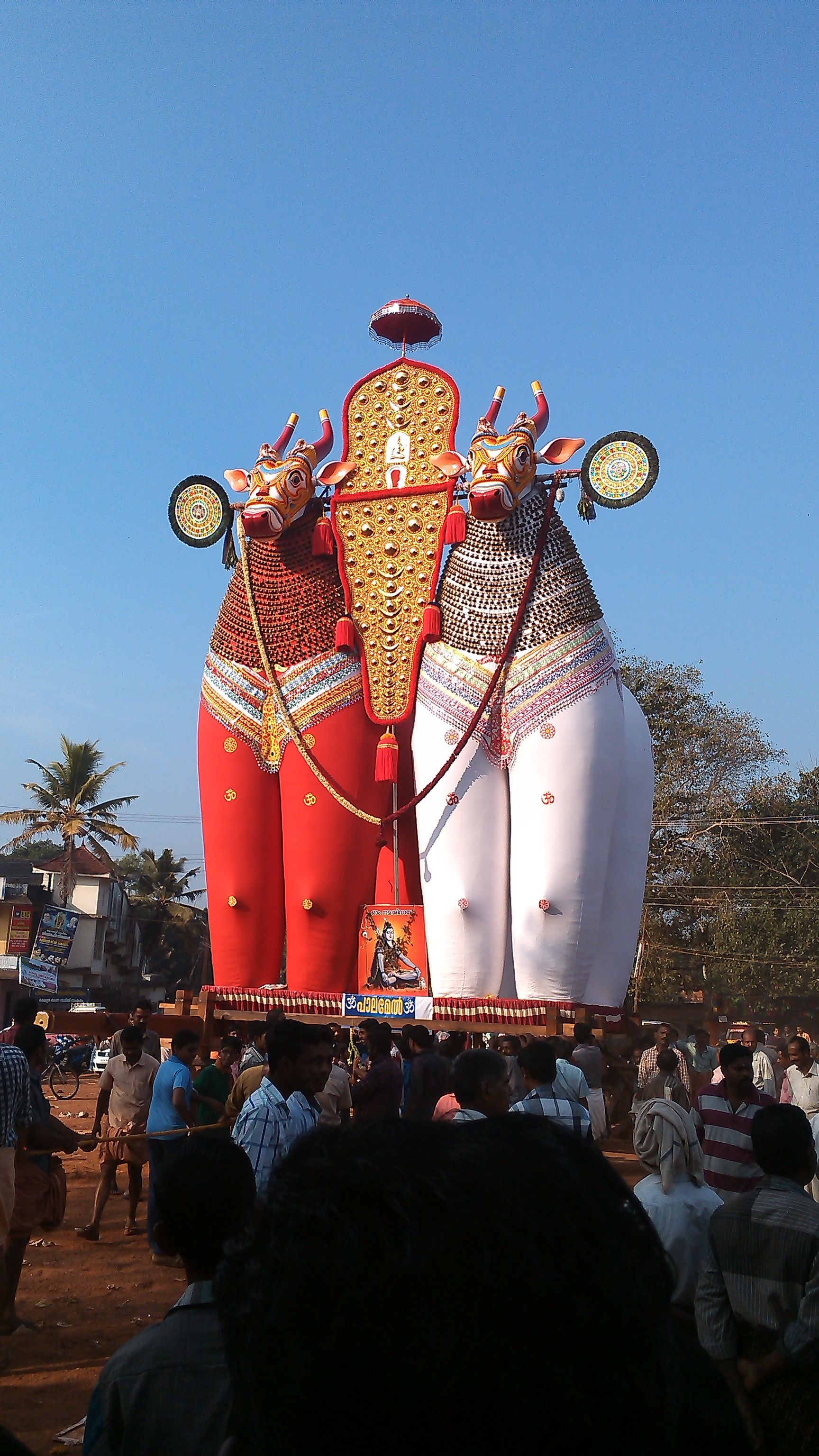
Kettukala festival

Palamel is a village in Alappuzha district in the Indian state of Kerala. It is located 10 km south of Pandalam.

== Demographics ==
As of 2011 India census, Palamel had a population of 32512 with 15229 males and 15229 females.

== Importance ==
Panayil & Muthukattukara Devi temples are the famous and ancient temples in this place. Chempakassery, an ancient nair family is one among the prominent family in this place. Palamel is bordering with Pandalam, Chunakkara, Nooranad and Thamarakkulam panchayaths. Palamel is part of the Onattukara cultural region. Kettu Kazhcha - a procession of two huge oxen is carried out here as part of the Padanilam Parabrahma Temple Sivarathri festival.

The Karingalichal Lake and puncha are situated near Palamel. It is part of Upper Kuttanad and lies in the Drainage basin of Achankovil river.

=== Famous Persons from Palamel ===
- P. Prasad - Cherthala M.L.A.
