= Puthuppally, Alappuzha =

Puthuppally
- Census Town
- Location in Kerala, India Puthuppally (India)
- Coordinates: 9°9′0″N 76°29′0″E
- Country: India
- State: Kerala
- District: Alappuzha

Government
  - Body: Devikulangara Grama Panchayat

Area
  - Total: 7.07 km^{2} (2.73 sq mi)

Population (2011)
  - Total: 20,390
  - Density: 2,880/km^{2} (7,470/sq mi)
- Demonym: Puthuppallikkaaran

Languages
  - Official: Malayalam, English
- Time zone: UTC+5:30 (IST)
- PIN: 690527
- Telephone code: 0479
- Nearest city: Kayamkulam

Puthuppally is a village in Alappuzha district in the Indian state of Kerala, located 5 km from the town of Kayamkulam. Puthuppally village is a part of Devikulangara Grama Panchayat.

== Demographics ==
As of 2011 Indian Census, Puthuppally (Village) had a population of 20390 with 9179 males and 11211 females.
