= Edappon =

Edappon Nooranad North
- town
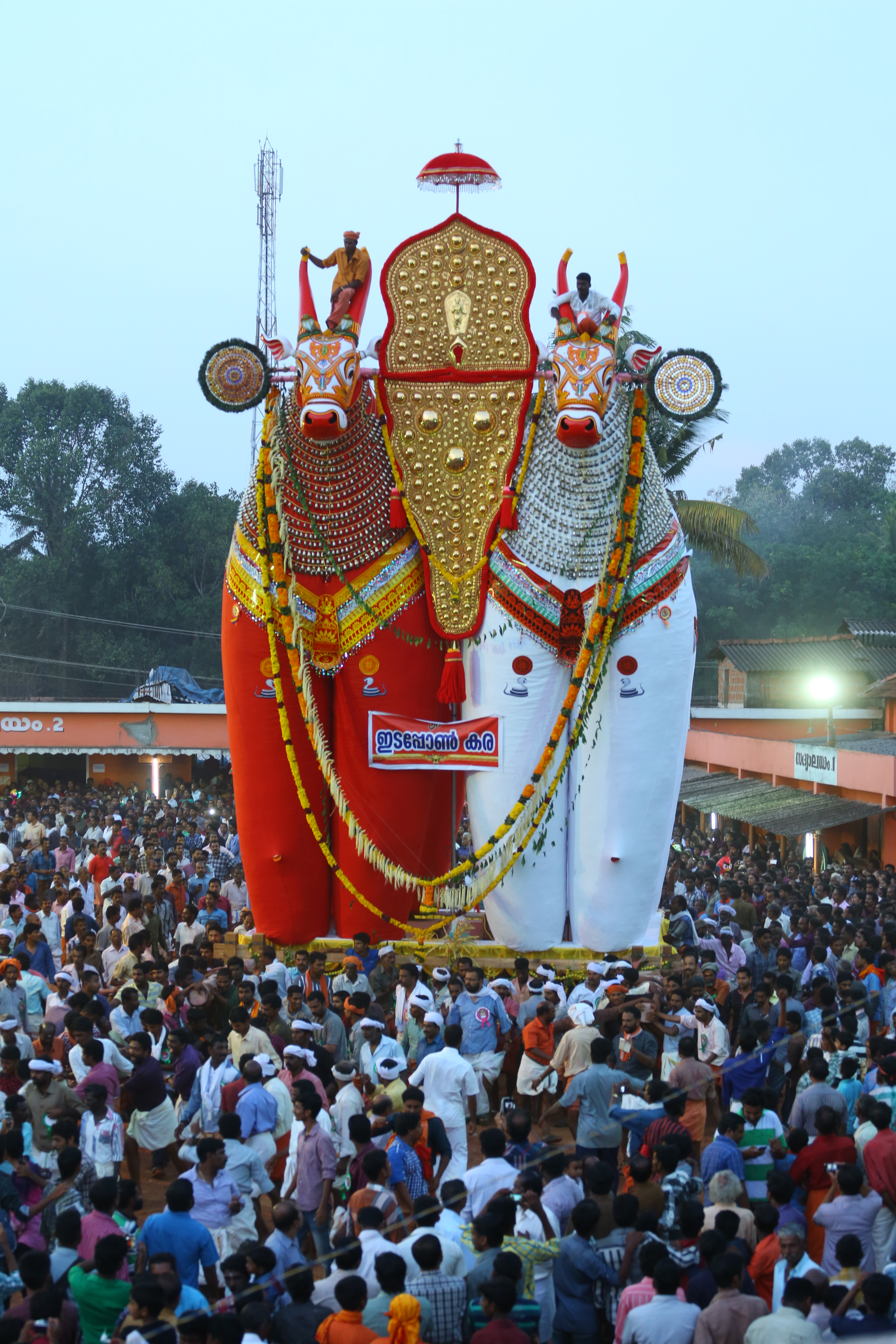
- Edappon kara kettukala at Padanilam Shivaratri
- Interactive map of Edappon
- Coordinates: 9.228876°N 76.627048°E
- Country: India
- State: Kerala
- District: Alappuzha

Languages
  - Official: Malayalam, English
- Time zone: UTC+5:30 (IST)
- PIN: 690558
- Telephone code: 0479

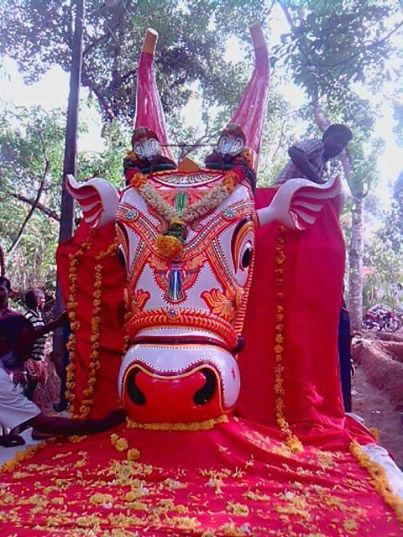
Edappon Kara kala thala for Padanilam Shivaratri

Edappon is a small town situated in Nooranad panchayat in Alappuzha district of the state of Kerala in South India. It is on the bank of the Achankovil river.

== Location ==
It is situated at a distance of 4 kilometres to the west of Pandalam and 12 km to the east of Mavelikara.

== Temples ==
Many ancient temples are located here.

- Puthenkavil Sree Devi Temple
- Dakshina kailasam (Siva Temple), Attuva
- Gurunatankavu Temple
- PlakkattethuTemple.
- Thiru-Ayiranikunnu Gangeshwara Vaidyanatha Temple, Ayranikudy

== Churches ==
- St. Bursoumas Orthodox Church, Attuva
- Immanuel Marthoma Church, Ayranikudy
- Church of God Pentecostal Church and
- Evanjalical Church Ayranikudy are the other major churches

Also the people of Edappon playing a vital role in the Maha Sivarathri of Padanilam Parabrahma Temple and Vishu of Sargakavu Devi Temple.

== Colleges ==
- Sree Buddha College of Engineering
- Josco College of Nursing
- Josco College of Paramedical

== Schools ==
- High School, Edappon
- Govt.U.P School, Cherumukha
- Veerasaiva U.P. School, AV Junction
- Vivekananda Vidyapedam School
- St. Bursoumas Public School & Junior College, Ayranikudy

== Hospitals ==
- Josco Multispeciality Hospital
- Govt. Primary Health Centre
- Santhi Hospital (Clinic)
