= Thamarakkulam =

Thamarakulam
- Village
- Location in Kerala, India Thamarakulam (India)
- Coordinates: 9°8′0″N 76°37′0″E
- Country: India
- State: Kerala
- District: Alappuzha

Government
  - Type: Panchayat

Population (2011)
  - Total: 27,017

Languages
  - Official: Malayalam, English
- Time zone: UTC+5:30 (IST)
- PIN: 690530
- Telephone code: 0479237
- Nearest city Kayamkulam: Mavelikkara
- Lok Sabha constituency: Mavelikkara
- Vidhan Sabha constituency: Mavelikkara

Thamarakulam is a village in Alappuzha district in the Indian state of Kerala. Located in Alappuzha District of Kerala, Thamarakulam is around 16 km south-east of Kayamkulam. It sits right on the tri-junction that forms the borders of Kollam, Pathanamthitta and Alappuzha districts. Kayamkulam, Mavelikara, Adoor, Ochira and Sasthamkotta are the nearby towns. Nearest airport is Trivandrum International Airport, which is 110 km south. Sasthamkotta Railway Station is the nearest railhead. Kayamkulam Junction Railway and Mavelikara Railway Station is a major railhead nearby. Kollam-Theni National Highway (NH 183) passes through Tamarakulam Grama panchayat. Charummood is the main junction to go to Kayamkulam, Mavelikkara and Adoor. VVHS Thamarakulam and VHSS Chathiyara are major schools in Thamarakulam.

Thamarakkulam area was under the Naduvazhi rule during the 16th to 19th century. "Moothanedathu Pillamar", an offshoot of Kayamkulam Raja, ruled the area during this time. Madhavapuram market is a famous and big market in olden days.

== Demographics ==
As of 2011 India census, Thamarakulam had a population of 27017 with 12624 males and 14393 females.
