= Chunakkara =

- village
- Location in Kerala, India Chunakkara (India)
- Coordinates: 9.1853200°N 76.59951°E
- Country: India
- State: Kerala
- District: Alappuzha

Population (2011)
  - Total: 22,730

Languages
  - Official: Malayalam, English
- Time zone: UTC+5:30 (IST)
- Postal code: 690534

Chunakkara is a village in Mavelikara Tahsil of Alappuzha district, in the Indian state of Kerala. It is located on the Kollam Theni Highway spanning in around 6 km (3.7 mi) in length along the highway. It is divided into 5 areas and 15 wards. It is located 10.5 km (6.5 mi) south from Mavelikara and 15 km (9.3 mi) west of Kayamkulam. Nearest railway stations are Kayamlulam railway station and Mavelikara railway station, both are accessible by public and private transports.

== Demographics ==
As per 2011 India census, Chunakkara had a population of 22,730, with 10,372 males and 12,358 females.

== Famous personalities ==
Malayalam poet and lyricist Chunakkara Ramankutty, and prominent film actor, producer and politician Mr. Mukesh are from Chunakkara.

== Place to visit ==
Chunakkara Thiruvayirur Mahadevar temple is a Lord Shiva temple located 2 km (1.2 mi) off the Kollam Theni Highway from Chunakkara Centre. An annual utsavavam (festival) is normally held between January and February.
