= Kayamkulam =

Town in Kerala, India

Kayamkulam Onattukara, Odanadu, Onad, Kallikoilon and Chirava Svaroopam
- Municipality
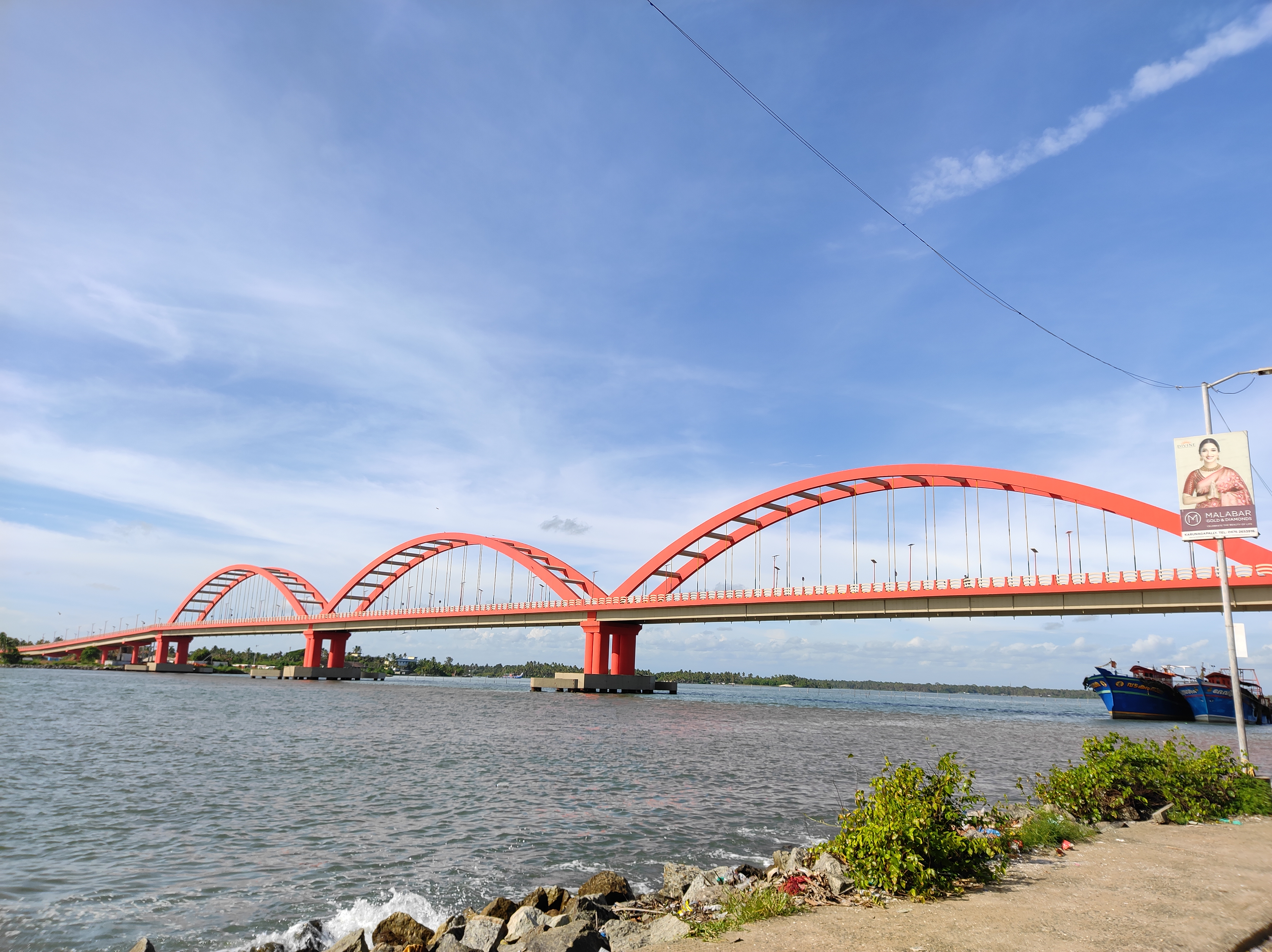
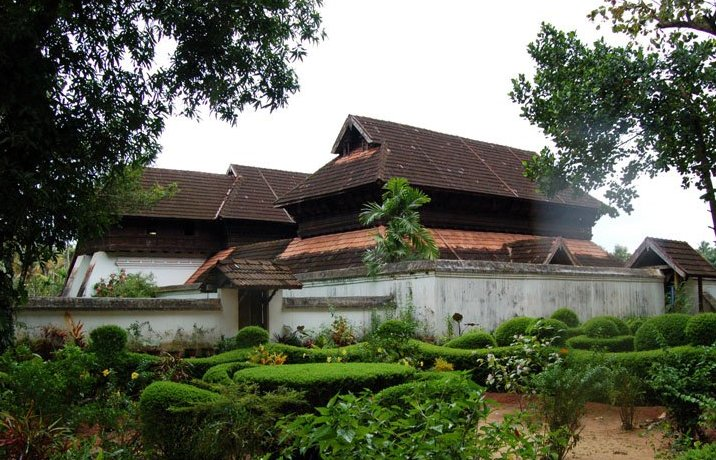
- Azheekal Bridge Krishnapuram Palace

- Location in Kerala, India Kayamkulam (India)
- Coordinates: 9.172°N 76.501°E
- Country: India
- State: Kerala
- District: Alappuzha

Government
  - Body: Kayamkulam Municipality
  - MLA: M. Liju
  - Chairman: Sarath Lal Bellari
  - Vice-Chairperson: Ambika

Area
  - Total: 21.79 km^{2} (8.41 sq mi)
  - Rank: 9th (Kerala Most Populous Urban agglomerations)

Population (2011)
  - Total: 68,634
  - Rank: 23rd (Most populous cities in kerala)
  - Density: 3,150/km^{2} (8,158/sq mi)

Languages
  - Official: Malayalam, English
- Time zone: UTC+5:30 (IST)
- PIN: 690502
- Telephone code: +91-479
- Vehicle registration: KL-29
- Nearest city: Kollam (37 km), Alappuzha (45 km), Pathanamthitta (41 km)
- Sex ratio: 1094 ♂/♀
- Literacy: 94.81% (2011 Census)

Kayamkulam (IPA: [kaːjɐmkuɭam, kaːjɐŋɡuɭam]) is a municipality in the Alappuzha district of Kerala, India. It is located 45 km (28.0 mi) south of the district headquarters in Alappuzha and about 107 km (66.5 mi) north of the state capital Thiruvananthapuram. As per the 2011 Indian census, Kayamkulam has a population of 68,634 people, and a population density of 3,149/km^{2} (8,160/sq mi).

Kayamkulam was the erstwhile capital of the Kingdom of Onattukara, and today continues to be the largest town in the Onattukara region.

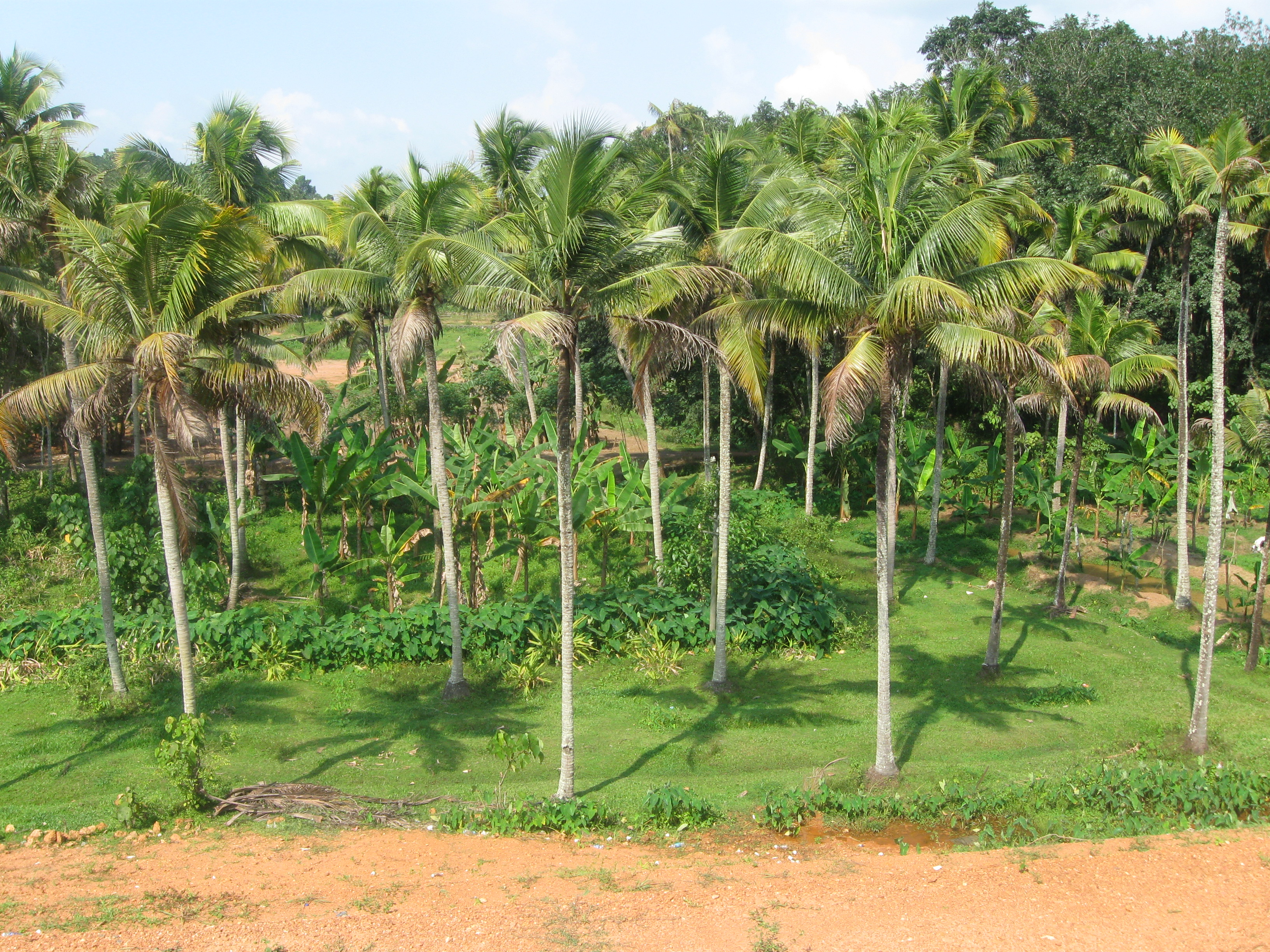
Coconut plantations

== History ==
Kayamkulam was a medieval feudal kingdom known as Odanad(also called Onattukara) ruled by the Kayamkulam rajas. Maha Raja Marthanda Varma (1706–58) conquered Kayamkulam and annexed its territories to Travancore. The history of Kayamkulam is a saga of a kingdom that was once a military powerhouse and a commercial hub for the pepper trade, until its dramatic fall in the 18th century.

== Notable locations and events ==
The Krishnapuram Palace, built in the 18th century, now functions as a museum. Constructed in typical Keralan-style architecture, it has the largest mural painting in Kerala. The palace museum houses the Kayamkulam double-edged sword.

The Shankar Memorial National Cartoon Museum and Art Gallery is an art museum located at Krishnapuram in Kayamkulam. Established in 2014 by the Kerala Lalithakala Akademi, the institution serves as a tribute to the legendary Indian cartoonist, Kesava Shankar Pillai (Shankar), who is widely regarded as the "father of political cartooning in India" and was born in the area. The museum is the first of its kind in Kerala and occupies a 15,000 square feet area, housing an extensive collection of Shankar's original works, including approximately 120 cartoons featuring prominent Indian political figures, along with his personal artifacts like his pen, brush, and easel. It also displays works by other notable cartoonists and hosts exhibitions and sculptures.

The Kayamkulam Boat Race is held on the fourth Saturday of August every year. Chinese fishing nets can be found on the banks of the lagoon.

== Transport ==
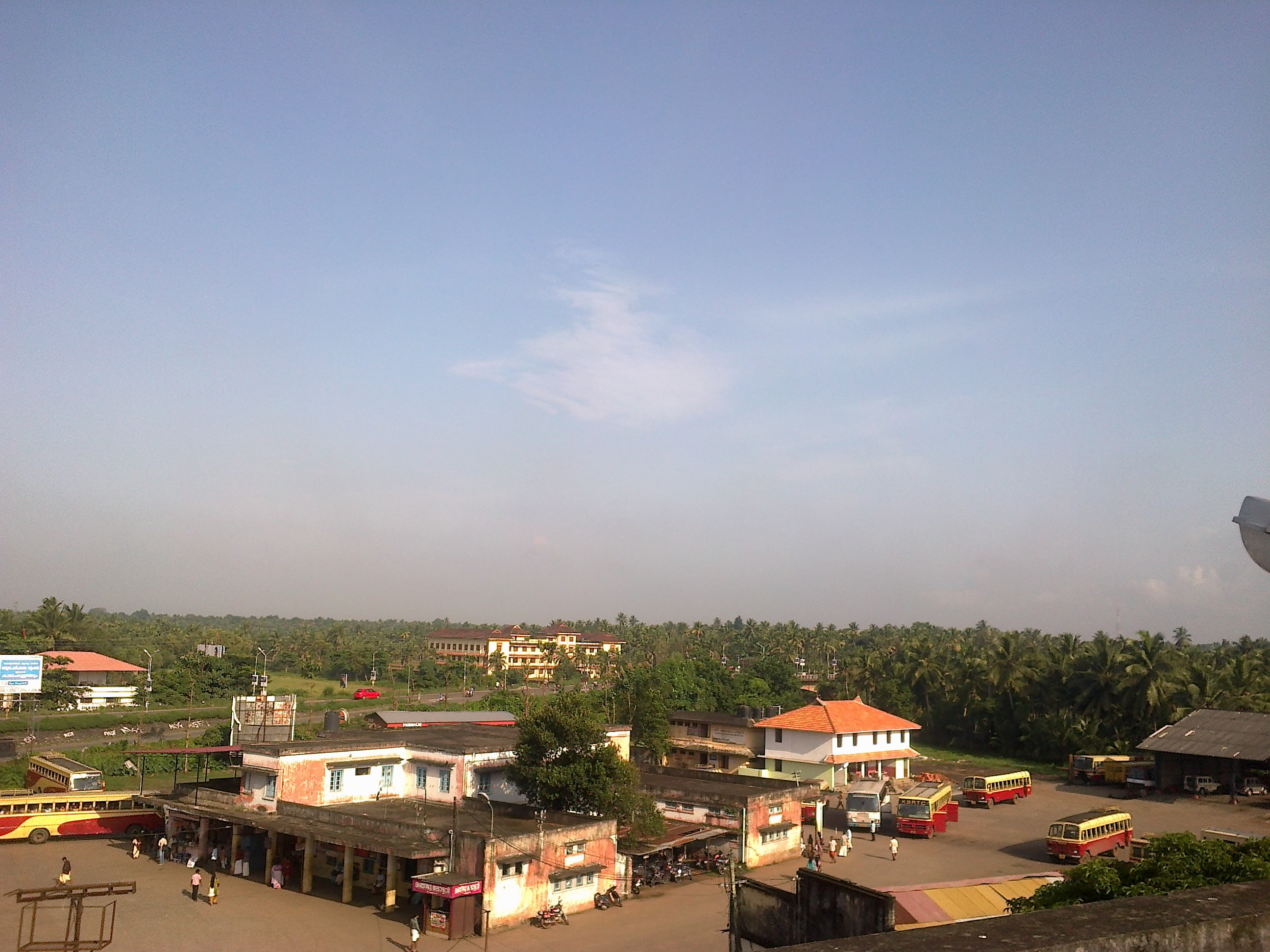
Kayamkulam City Bus Stand

=== Roads ===
NH 66 passes through Kayamkulam, connecting it to the major cities Alappuzha, Kochi, Thiruvananthapuram, Thrissur, Kollam, Palakkad and Nagercoil. The Kayamkulam–Punalur road (KP Road) is a major road connecting it to major city's in east sengotai,Tenkasi,Thirunelveli via Pettah parts of the Tamil Nadu state. The KSRTC bus station is located near the national highway.

=== Railways ===
Kayamkulam Junction railway station is a major railway junction located 1.5 km (0.93 mi) from the town on the Kayamkulam–Punalur road.

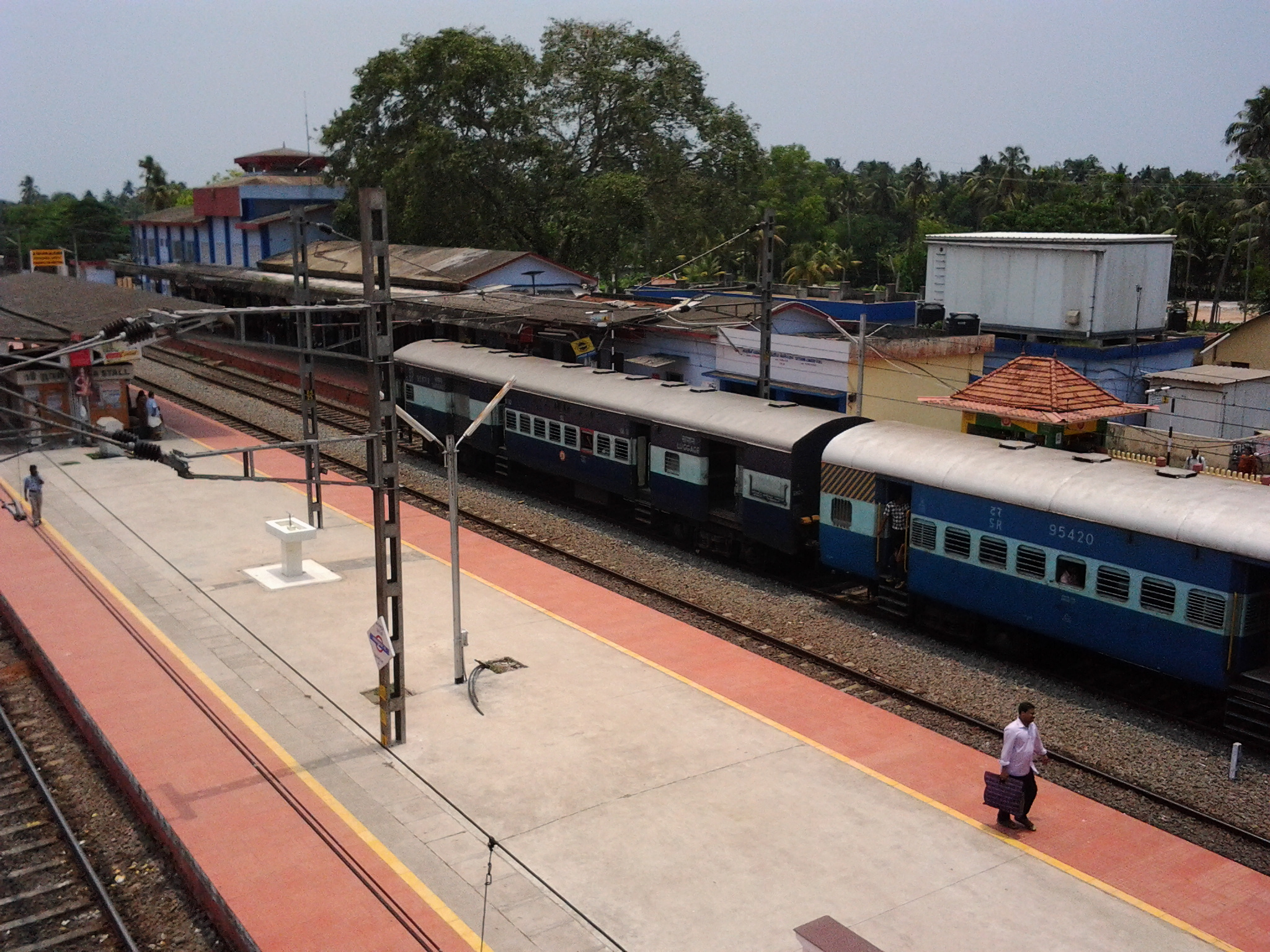
Kayamkulam Railway Junction

=== Waterways ===
National Waterway 3 (NW-3), also known as the West Coast Canal, spans approximately 205 km between Kollam and Kozhikode. About 25 km of this route passes directly through Kayamkulam Lake.

Kayamkulam IWT Terminal, A fixed Inland Water Transport (IWT) terminal occupies roughly 1.63 acres in Kayamkulam. It is one of nine strategic terminals developed by the Inland Waterways Authority of India (IWAI) along NW-3.

== Demographics ==
According to the 2011 Census of India, Kayamkulam municipality had a population of 68,634. Males constituted 47.8% (32,784) of the population and females 52.2% (35,850). The municipality has a high sex ratio of 1,094 females per 1,000 males, which is higher than the Kerala state average of 1,084. Children under six years of age made up 10.07% (6,914) of the total population

The average literacy rate in Kayamkulam is 94.81%, higher than the state average of 94.00%. Male literacy stands at 96.72%, while female literacy is 93.10%

Year	Male	Female	Total Population	Change	Religion (%)							
Year	Male	Female	Total Population	Change	Hindu	Muslim	Christian	Sikhs	Buddhist	Jain	Other religions and persuasions	Religion not stated
2001	31,997	33,302	65,299	-	55.78	36.26	7.92	0	0	0.01	0	0.03
2011	32,784	35,850	68,634	+5.1%	53.30	39.07	7.32	0.01	0.01	0	0.01	0.28

1. Hindu (53.3%)
2. Muslim (39.1%)
3. Christian (7.32%)
4. Others (0.31%)

== Civic administration ==
Kayamkulam Assembly Constituency is part of Alappuzha.

== Educational and research institutes ==
The Central Coconut Research Station (CCRS) was established in 1948 as a field station of the Agricultural Research Laboratory. Presently, it is a regional station of the Central Plantation Crops Research Institute (CPCRI).

Onattukara Regional Agricultural Research Station, Kayamkulam is located in the Kayamkulam Municipality of Alappuzha District, one kilometer east of Kayamkulam town, on the northern side of Kayamkulam - Punalur road. The station was established in the year 1937 under the erstwhile University of Travancore. It was subsequently transferred to the Department of Agriculture in 1958 and continued to function under it till it became a part of the KAU on 07.02.72. I n April, 2000, this Station was upgraded to the status of RARS (Onattukara Region).

== KPAC drama troupe ==
Kerala People's Arts Club (KPAC) is a theatrical movement in Kayamkulam, Kerala. It was formed in the 1950s by a group of individuals that had close ties with the leftist parties of Kerala.

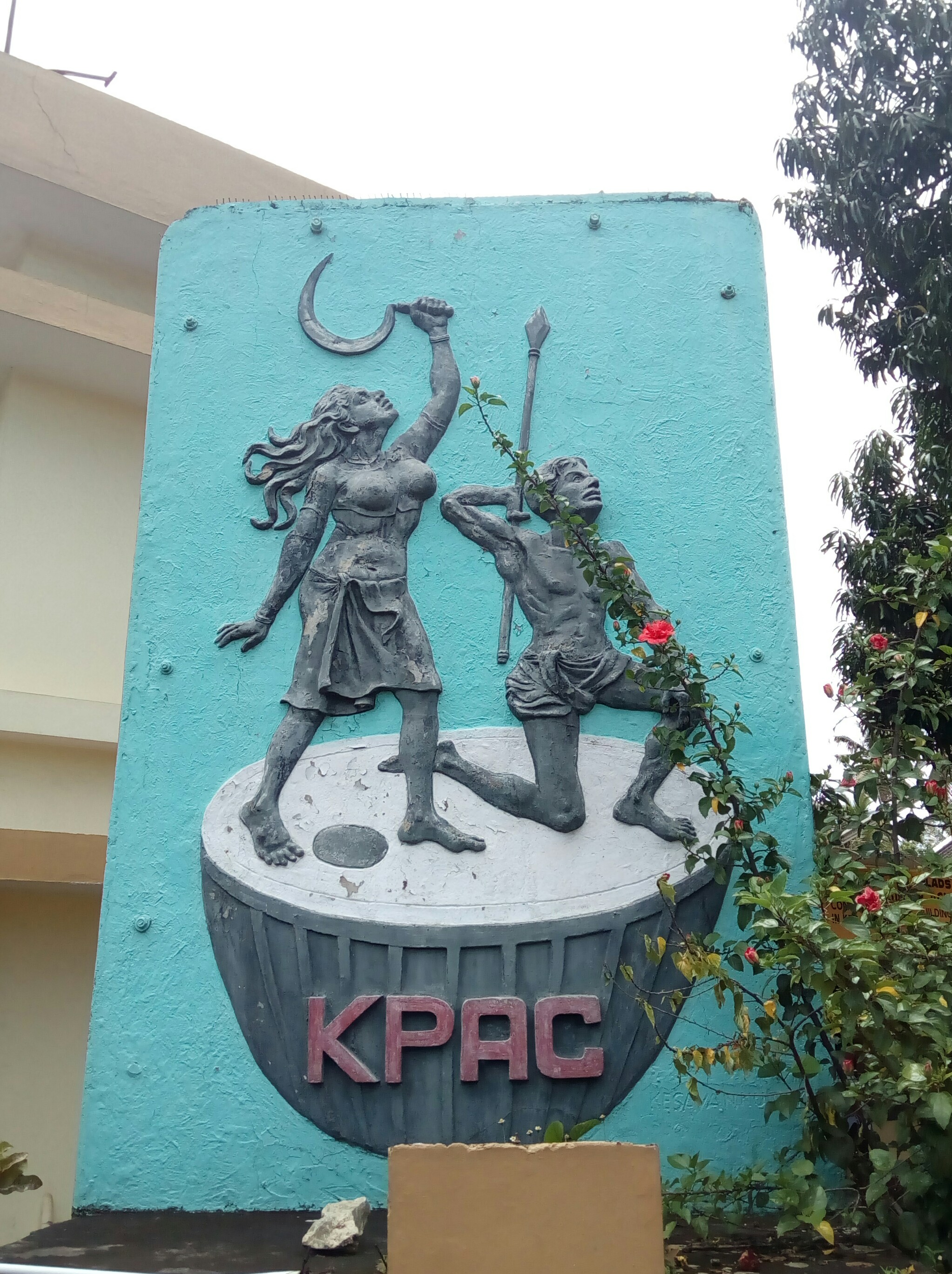
KPAC emblem

In 1951 KPAC staged its first drama, Ente Makananu Sari (transl. "My Son is Right"), whose songs were written by Punaloor Balan. Its second drama Ningalenne Communistakki (transl. "You Made Me a Communist") was first performed in 1952. The success of Ningalenne Communistakki brought KPAC to the forefront of a powerful people's theatre movement in Kerala.

KPAC played a significant role in popularising the Communist Party in Kerala through its dramas, road shows and kathaprasangams (story telling).

== Rajiv Gandhi Combined Cycle Power Plant (NTPC Kayamkulam) ==
Rajiv Gandhi Combined Cycle Power Plant or Kayamkulam NTPC (also known as Rajiv Gandhi CCPP) is a 350 MW naphtha-based power plant which is largely idle due to high production costs, but the site is operational for other projects, most notably a 92 MW floating solar power plant.

== Notable people ==
- Thopil Bhasi – Malayalam playwright, screenwriter, and film director
- K. M. Cherian – heart surgeon; founder of Frontier Lifeline Hospital and the Dr. K M Cherian Heart Foundation
- Michael Mor Dionysus - Jacobite Syriac Orthodox Church Metropolitan, Municipal Councillor of Sree Moolam Popular Assembly
- Kambisseri Karunakaran – journalist, politician, actor, satirist and rationalist
- P. Kesavadev – novelist, writer, and social reformer
- Kayamkulam Kochunni – highwayman based in Kayamkulam, active in Central Travancore in the early 19th century
- K. P. A. C. Lalitha – National Award-winning Indian film and stage actress
- S. Guptan Nair – Malayalam writer, critic, scholar and educationist
- K. Shankar Pillai – cartoonist, founder of Shankar's Weekly
- Thachadi Prabhakaran – former Minister of Kerala
- Kayamkulam Philipose Ramban – Christian priest
- T. P. Sreenivasan - diplomat; former High Commissioner to Fiji and Kenya and Ambassador to Austria

== See also ==
- Pathiyoor
- Kattanam
- Charummood
- Mavelikkara
- Adoor
- Pandalam
- Chengannur
- Mannar
- Vallikunnam
- Alappuzha Lok Sabha constituency
- Oachira
- Padanilam
- Chettikulangara
- Puthuppally
