= Chettikulangara Kumbha Bharani =

Festival in South India

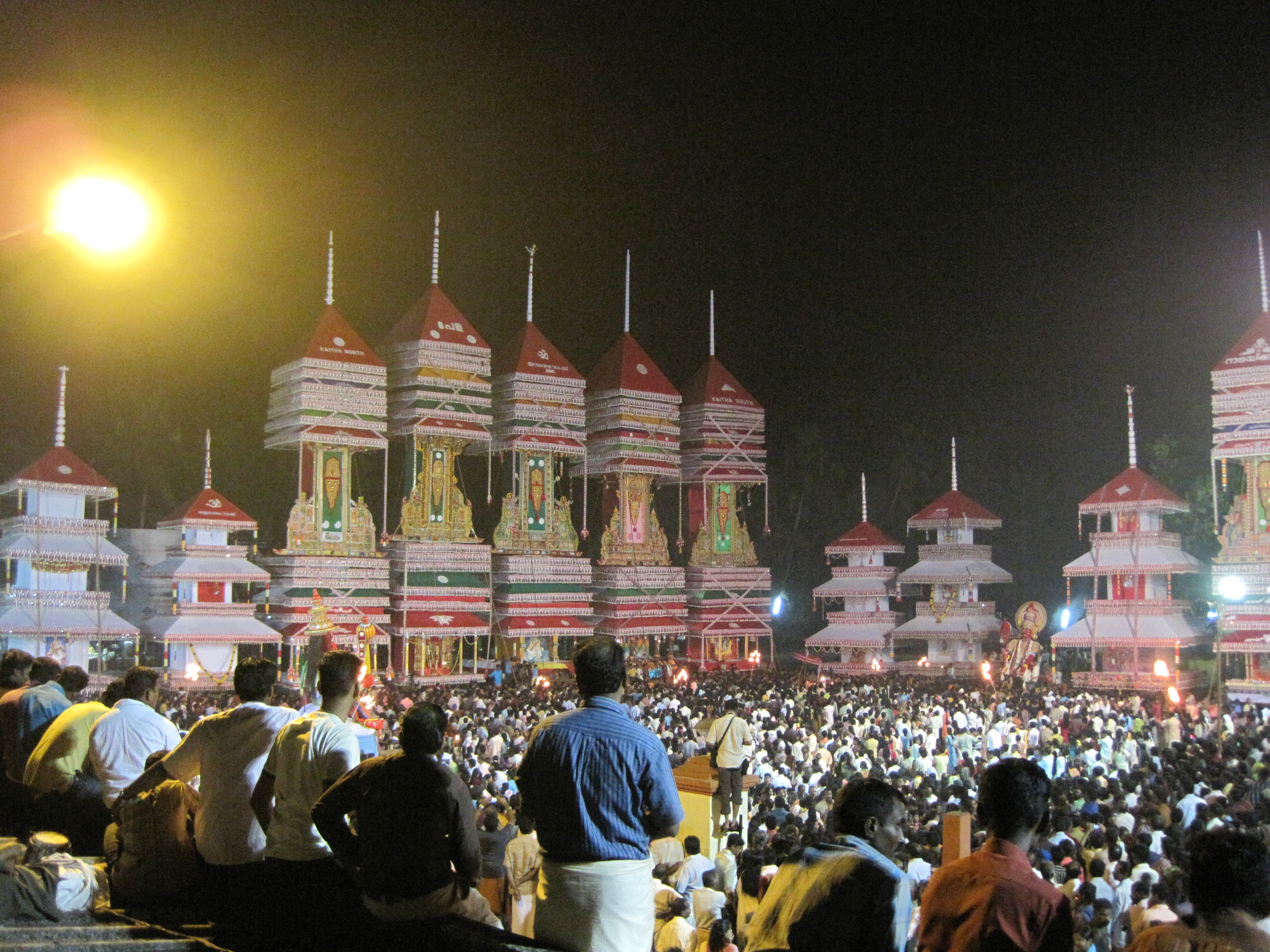
- Configuration of the floats including temple cars and effigies from the 13 provinces
- Status: Active
- Genre: Festival
- Date: Bharani Nakshatra in the Malayalam Calendar month of Kumbham (Feb/Mar accordingly)
- Frequency: Annually
- Venue: Chettikulangara Devi Temple
- Locations: Chettikulangara; Alappuzha District, Kerala
- Coordinates: 9.227°N 76.517°E
- Country: India
- Inaugurated: Early 19^{th} century
- Previous event: 04 March 2025
- Next event: 23 February 2026
- Organiser: Sree Devi Vilasom Hindumatha Convention
- Website: Chettikulangara.org

Chettikulangara Kumbha Bharani is a festival celebrated every year at the Chettikulangara Devi Temple, Chettikulangara, Alappuzha district, Kerala. It is held in the month of February or March, the date being determined according to the Malayalam Calendar. Chettikulangara Bharani in the Bharani nakshatra in the Malayalam month of Kumbha and hence the name Kumbha Bharani. Kuthiyottam and Kettukazhcha are the highlights of the festival. The festival is under consideration to be bestowed with the Intangible Cultural Heritage status by UNESCO.

== Origins ==
According to a legend, a group of Village chieftains and their workers went to construct the Kollam – Chavara canal, acting on the decision of their King. They were stranded due to an inordinate delay in construction. Authorities turned down their plea to return. During the period they visited the temple festivities of Kollam Mulankadakam temple. Attracted by the Kettukazhcha there they vowed to their local deity Chettikulangara Bhagavathy, that they would construct similar Kettukazhchas for her every year, if they were allowed to leave for Chetitkulangara immediately. To their surprise, they were allowed to return to Chettikulangara the very next day, and as promised, they made huge Kettukazhchas and took them to their Bhagavathy's premises.

== Kuthiyottam ==
Kuthiyottam is performed as the most important offering to the deity. It is a symbolic human sacrifice to appease goddess Kali. It is believed that the origin of kuthiyottam is from blood sacrifice to please the ferocious Goddess Kali and the ritual has moderated over time, possibly under the influence of Buddhism. The person who vow to offer Kuthiyottam, adopt two or four pre-pubescent boys who are symbolically sacrificed. They are adopted on the day of shivaratri and brought to the sponsors house where a canopy is erected and a shrine of Kali is constructed. They are taught basic kuthiyottam steps by trained performers. On the day of Bharani the boys are bathed and dressed up as kings with paper crown, bangles, fac. Their abdominal skin is pierced with silver or golden thread. The ritual is known as Chooral Muriyal the name comes from Chooral (cane), as cane threads were used earlier and muri (cut). They are then taken to the temple, accompanied by pompous procession. In the front of the sanctum sanctorum they perform the steps taught to them to four songs praising the goddess and thread is then removed and offered to the goddess. These boys are now ritually dead and may not take part in kuthiyottam again.

Kuthiyottam is a blend of dance, music and ritual. The boys perform folk dance to Kuthiyottam folk song. In every house vowed to offer kuthiyottam, performance by trained artist will also be hosted alongside teaching the boys Kuthiyottam. Kuthiyottam folk song has tanavattam tala. Kuthiyottam used to be done only in houses in the 13 Karas of the Chettikulangara Temple but after a recent Deva Prashnam it was allowed to conduct Kuthiyottam in the houses outside of the 13 Karas.

== Kettukazhcha ==
Kettukazhcha is an offering of people of the 13 provinces to their deity to thank for favors received as well as to seek her blessings. Chettikulangara kettukazhcha consists of 13 provincial floats including six huge and heavily decorated temple cars known as Kuthira (Horses), five smaller temple cars known Theru (Chariots) and effigies of Bhima, Hanuman and Panchali.

=== Kuthira ===
Although Kuthira means horse, the temple cars have no resemblance to horses and the origin of the name is still unknown. Kuthiras are the bigger of the temple cars and have a height of about 80 to 85 feet. The bottom most part of the Kuthira is called Adikkottu or Vandikkoottu. It is the basic foundation on which the rest of the parts rests on. It is a platform having four big wooden wheels, interconnected by wooden beams. Attached to the platform are two huge wooden poles (Achuthandu), used to steer the Kuthira. Above the Adikkottu there is Kathirukal with a height of 35 feet, consists of four long poles. They are interconnected with arecanut poles (Alaku) and further strengthened with crisscross formation of Alakus (Kuthukathrika) fastened by coir and Panavalli knots. Bottom part of the Kathirukal, called Adikoodaram consist of four to five extended layers of slanting box pyramids (Thattu & Charippu), then decorated with white cloth (Vella), colourful glittering clothes and embellishments (Thookku). Above the Adikoodaram there is Prabhada. Prabhada is the most magnificent part of the Kuthira. It consist of carved wooden sculptors narrating tales like Krishnaleela, Gajendra Moksham, etc... in the middle of there is elephant caparisons (Nettipattom). Although the Prabhada gives the impression that it is carved on a single wood, is actually composed of small carefully assembled fragments. Positioned above the Prabhada, Edakoodaram is almost half the size of Kathirukal with four to five Charippu made as in the lower portion, comes above the Kathirukal. It also has glittering different clothes and Vella, interlaced with colourful Thookku embellishments. On top of the Kuthira there is Melkkoodaram, pyramidal in shape, Melkkoodaram of Chettikulangara Kuthira is four faced Kumbhathoppi, not the three face Pallimukham. A white wooden pole (Nambu) extends from the top of the Melkkoodaram. In Kuthira the size from top to bottom is almost same except for the Prabhada in between.

=== Theru ===
Theru means chariot but they resemble pagodas rather than chariots. Theru is smaller than Kuthiras they do not have Prabhada and Edakkoodaram. They have bigger Charippu and prominent Illithattu in between Charippu. They diminish in size upwards.

=== Hanuman ===
Mattom South brings wooden effigy of Hanuman. Human effigy depicts Hanuman in the court of Ravana. Kadalipazham garland is the offering for Hanuman.

=== Panchali ===
Panchali effigy is also brought by Mattom South. The effigy depicts Panchali, clad in ornaments, waiting for Bhima who went to gather Kalyanasougandikam flower. Silk is the offering to Panchali.

=== Bhima ===
Mattom North bring a massive three and half tonne wooden effigy of Bhima. The effigy depicts Bhima riding bullock cart en route to kill demon Bakasuran.

=== Gallery ===
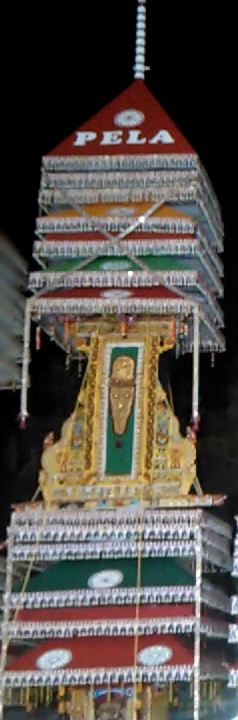
Kuthira from the kara Pela

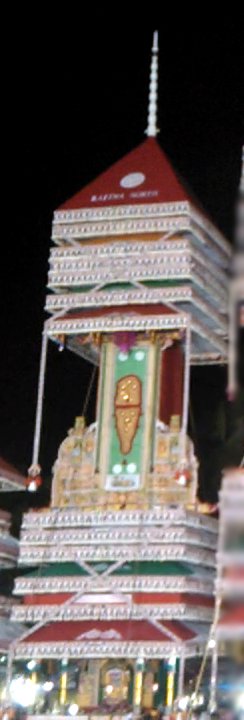
Kuthira from the kara Kaitha north

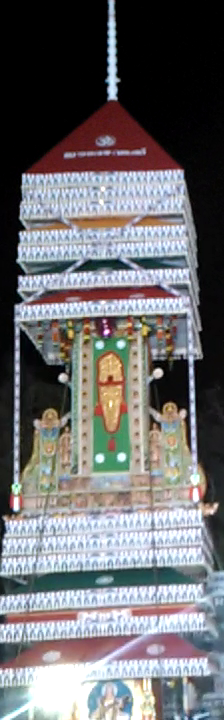
Kuthira from the kara Erezha North

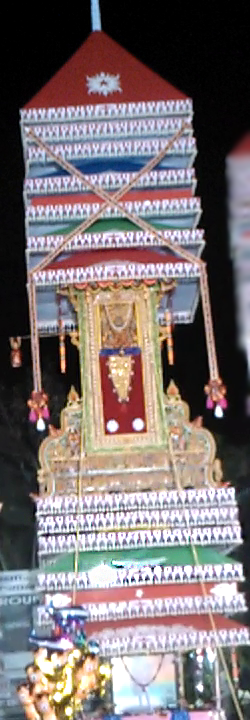
Kuthira from the kara Erezha South
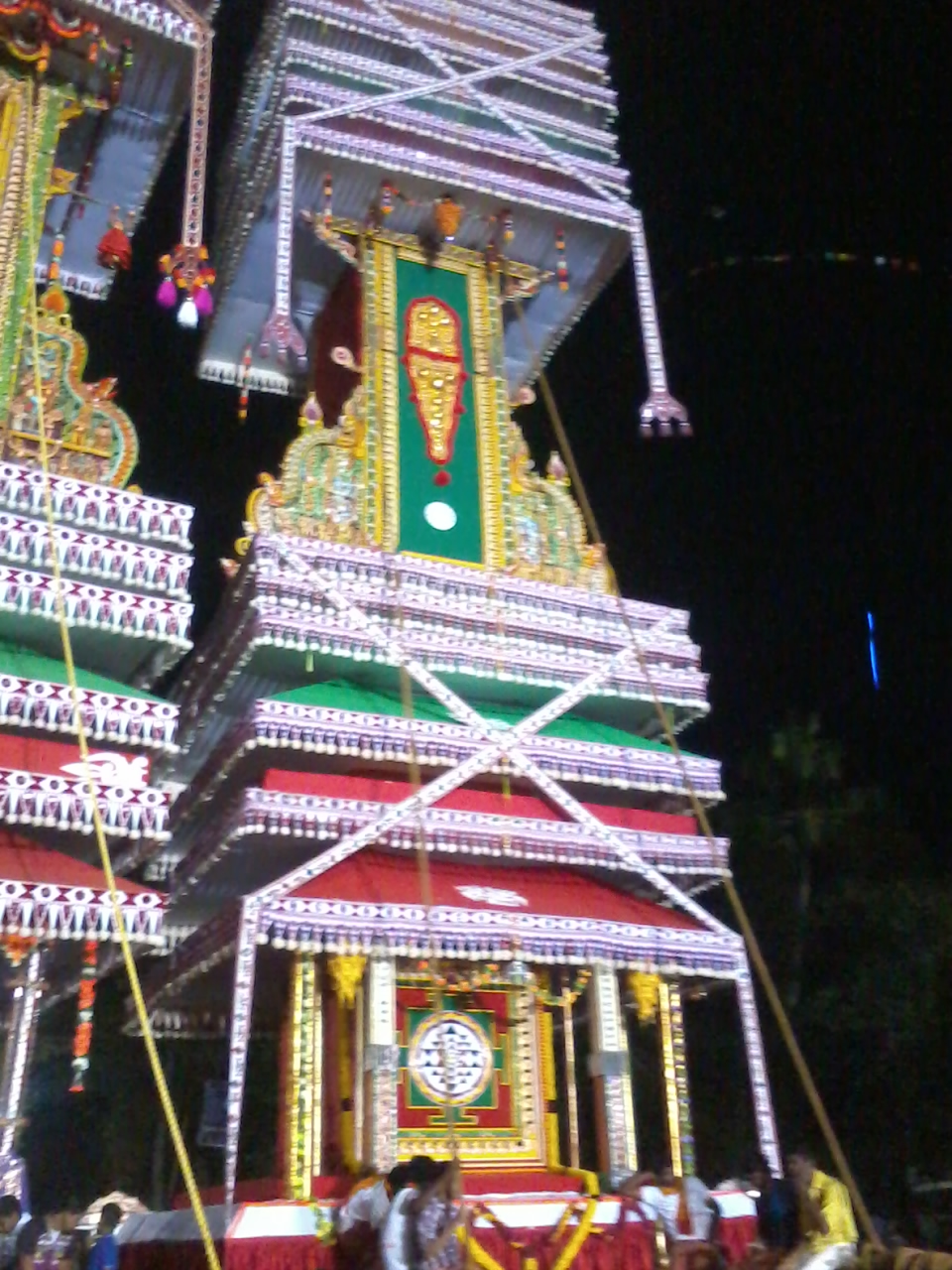
Kuthira from the kara Kaitha South

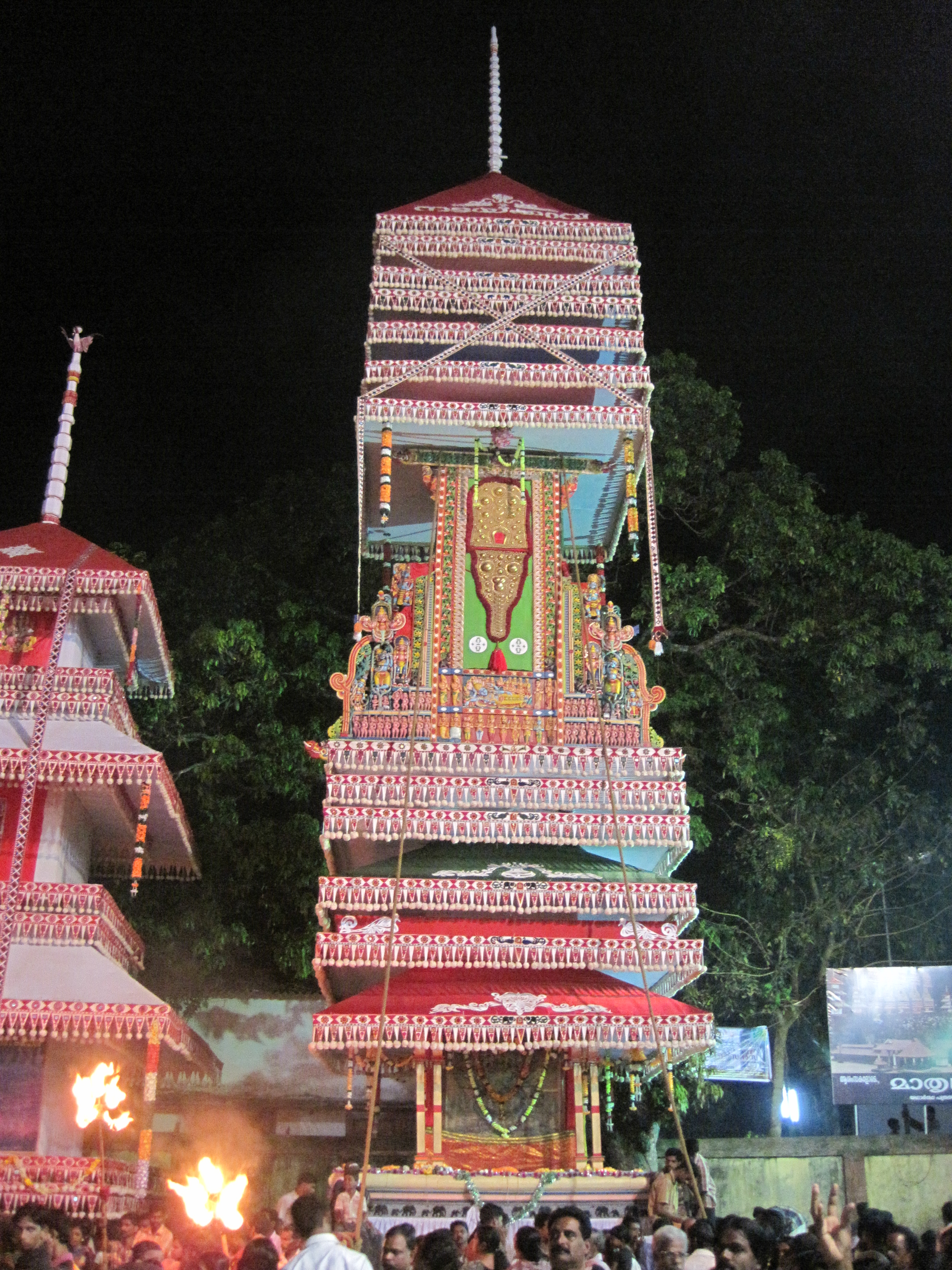
Kuthira from the kara Nadakavu

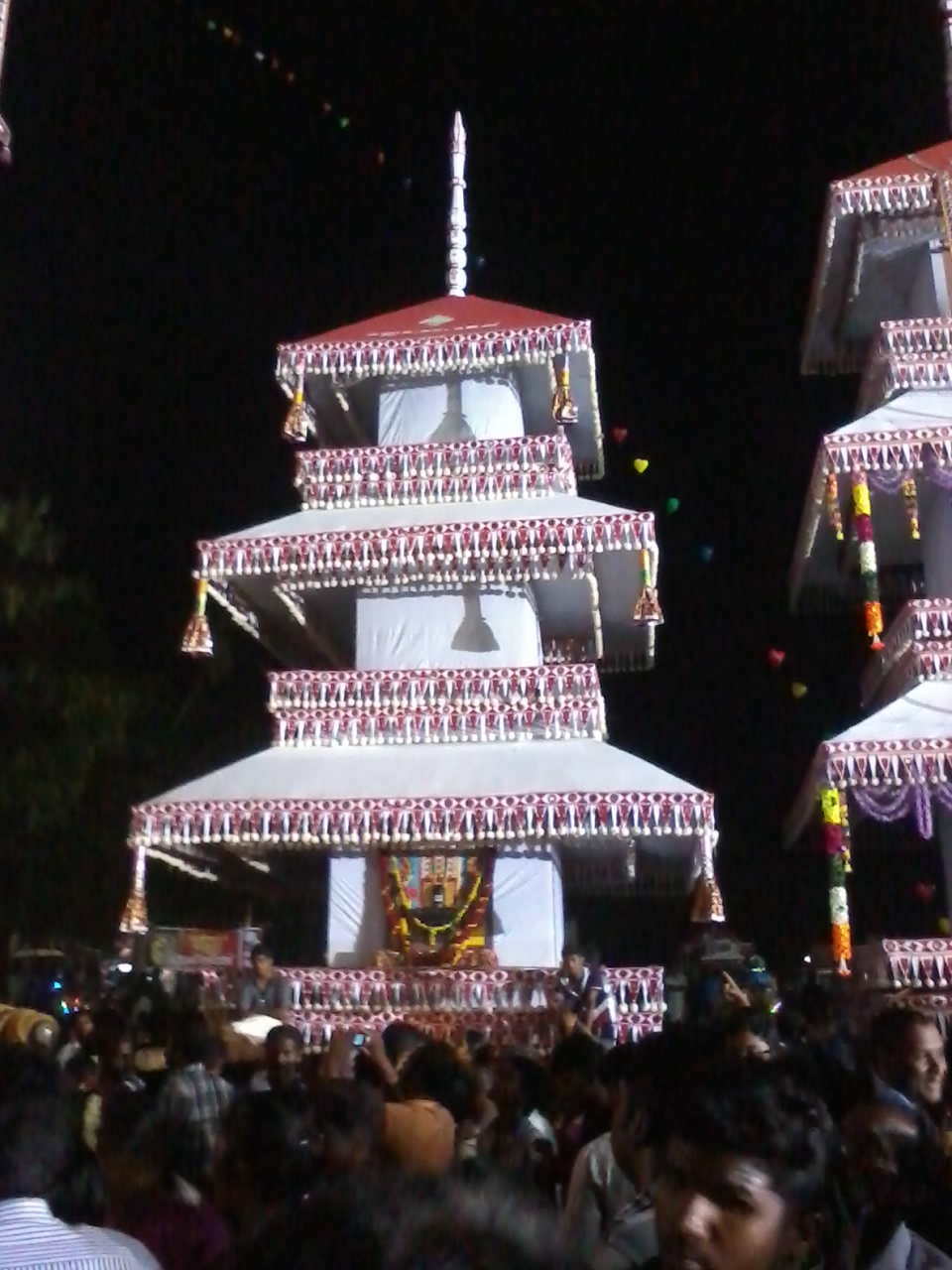
Theru from the kara Kannamangalam South

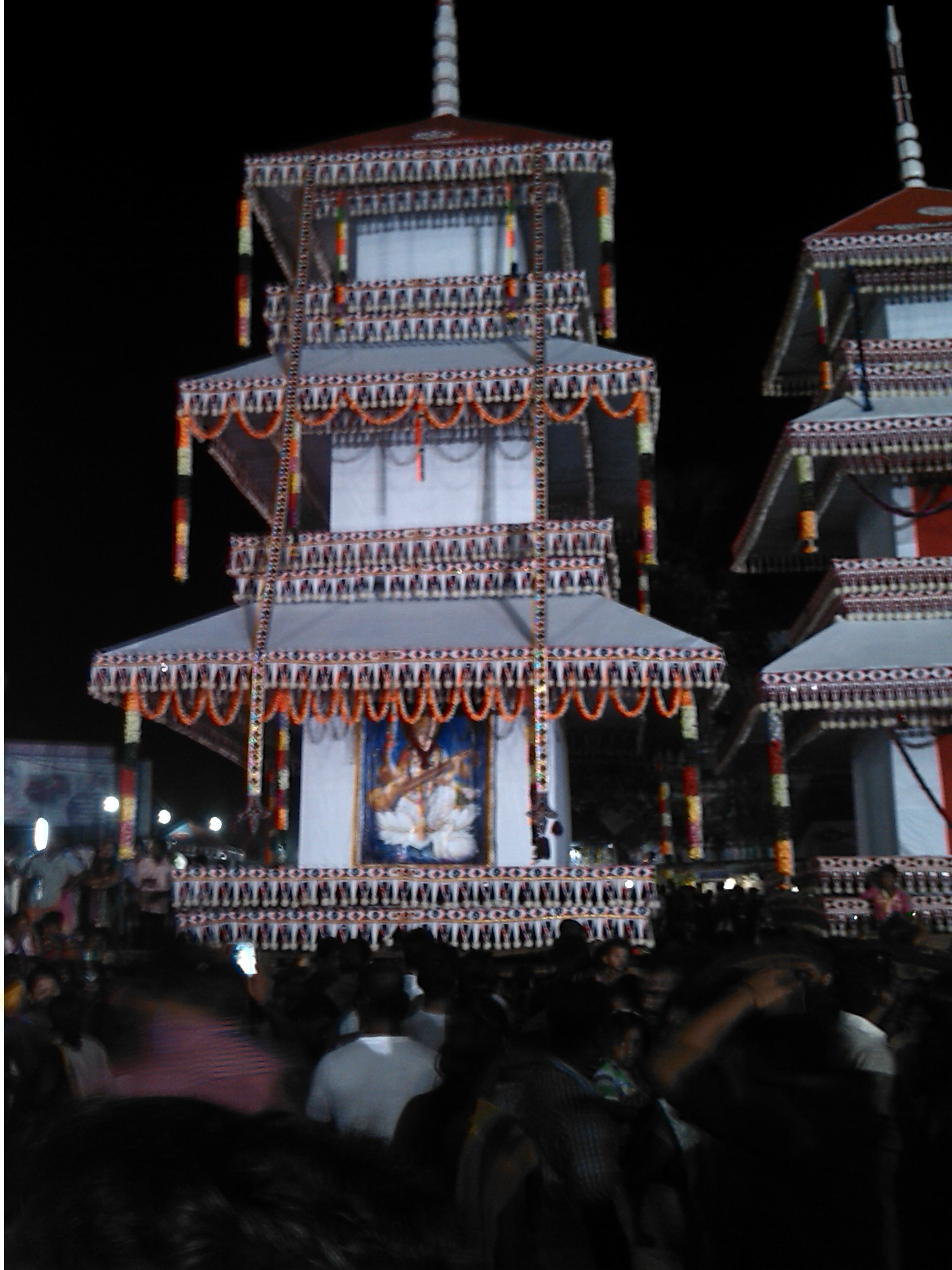
Theru from the kara Anjilipra
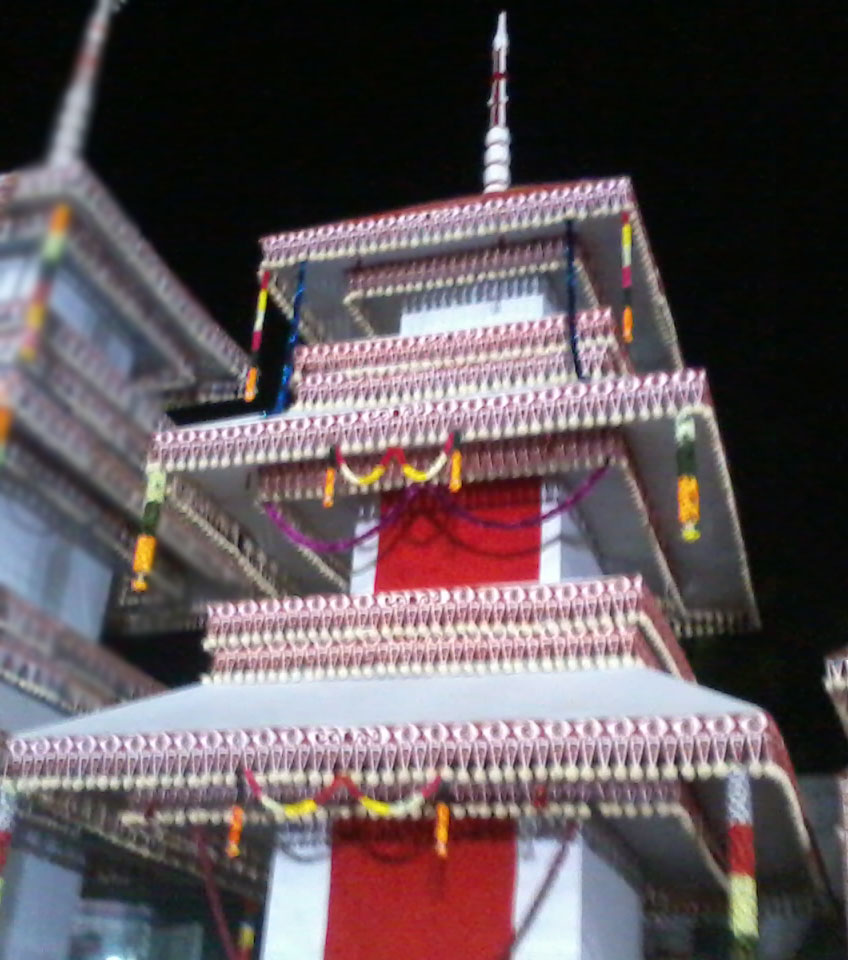
Theru from the kara Kannamangalam

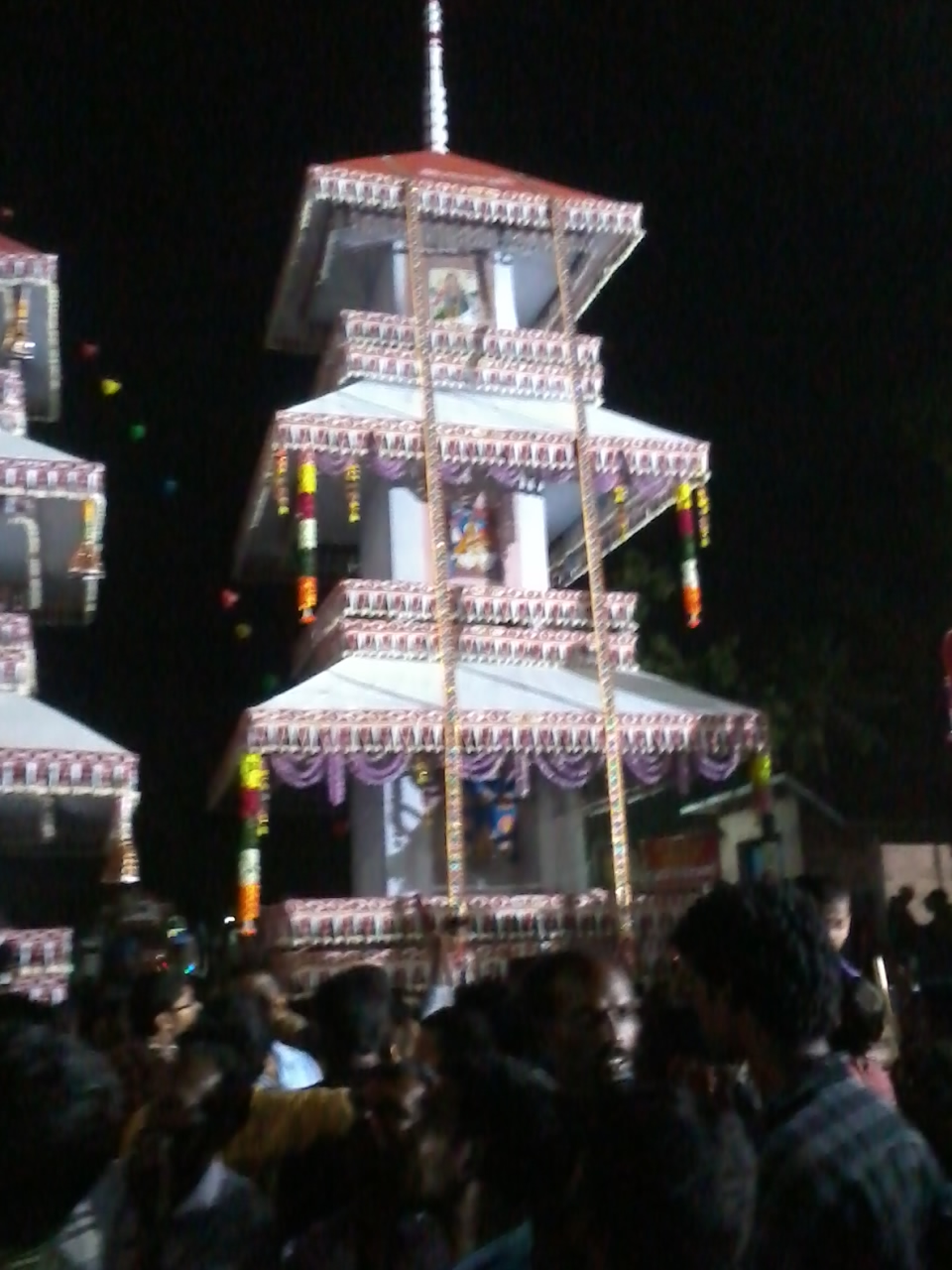
Theru from the kara Kadavoor

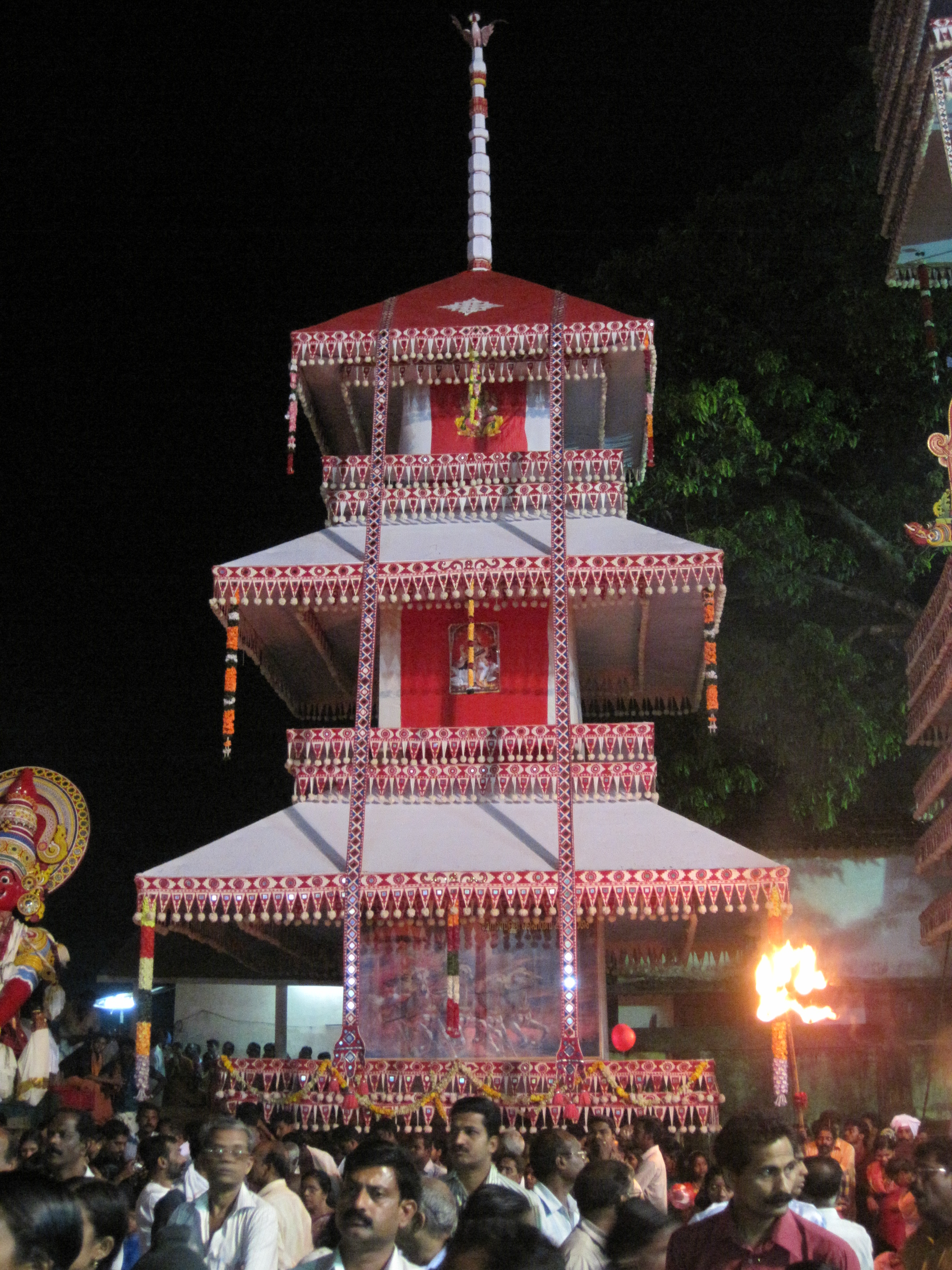
Theru from the kara Menampally
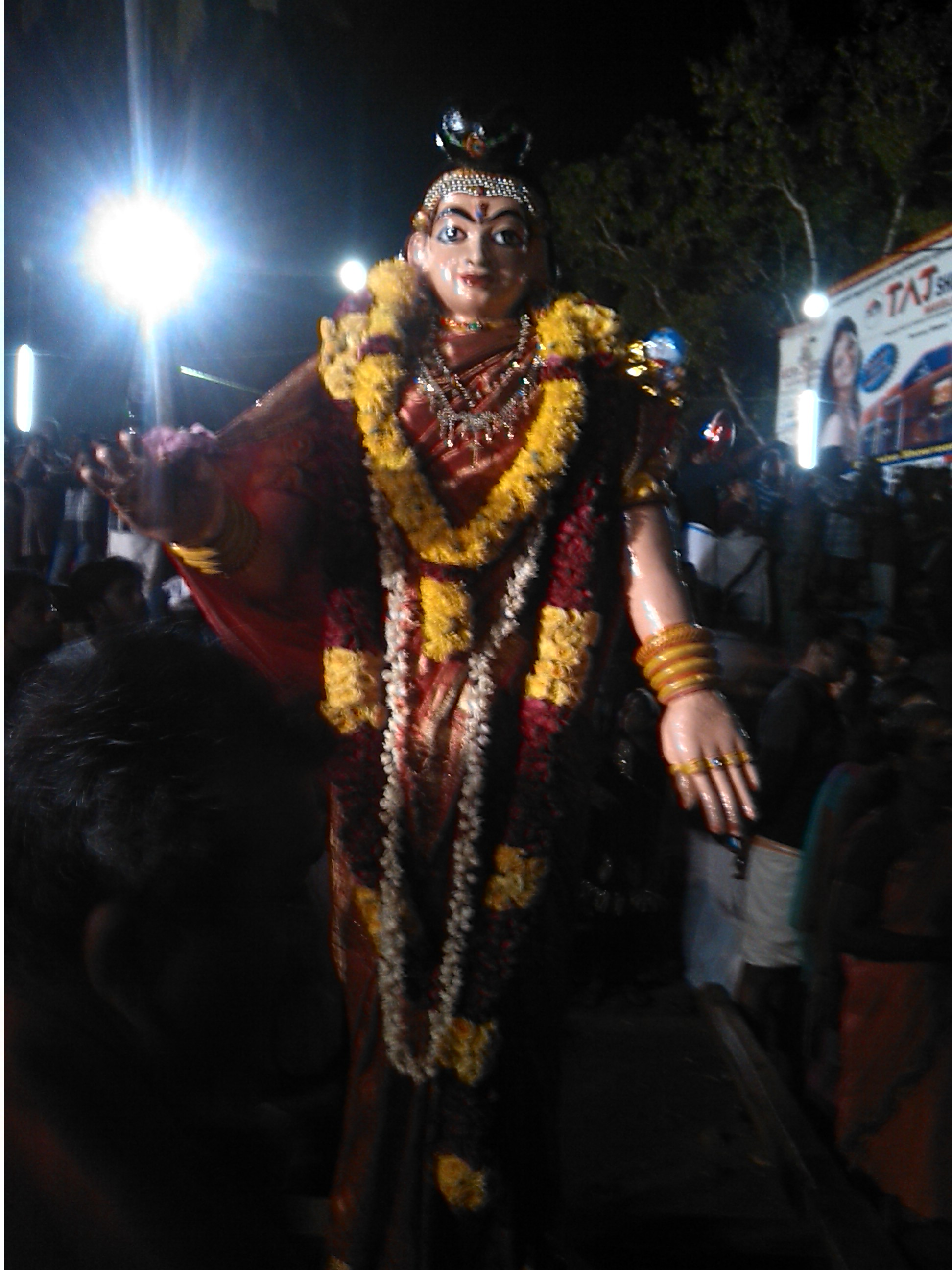
Panchali effigy from Mattom South

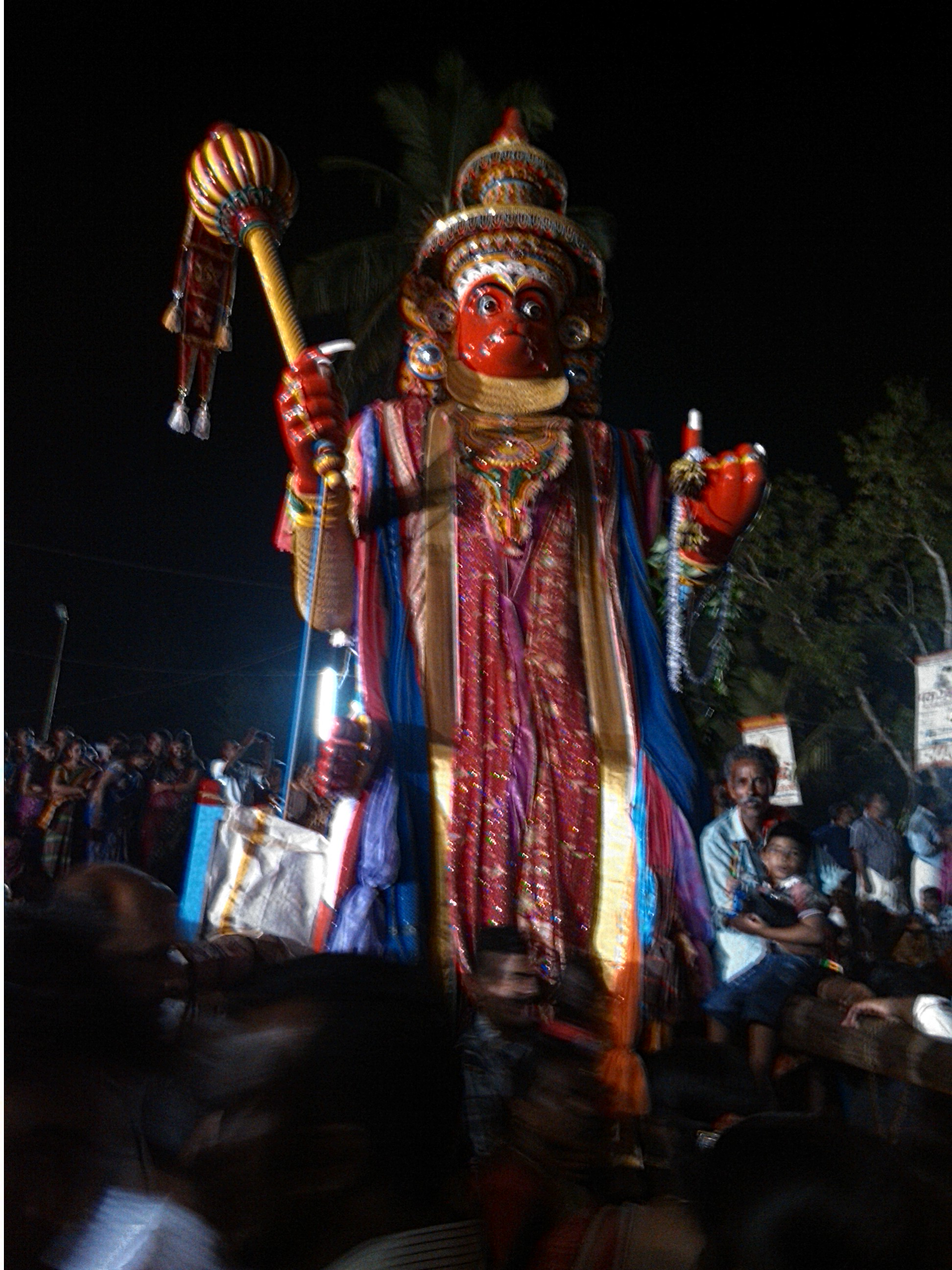
Hanuman effigy from Mattom South

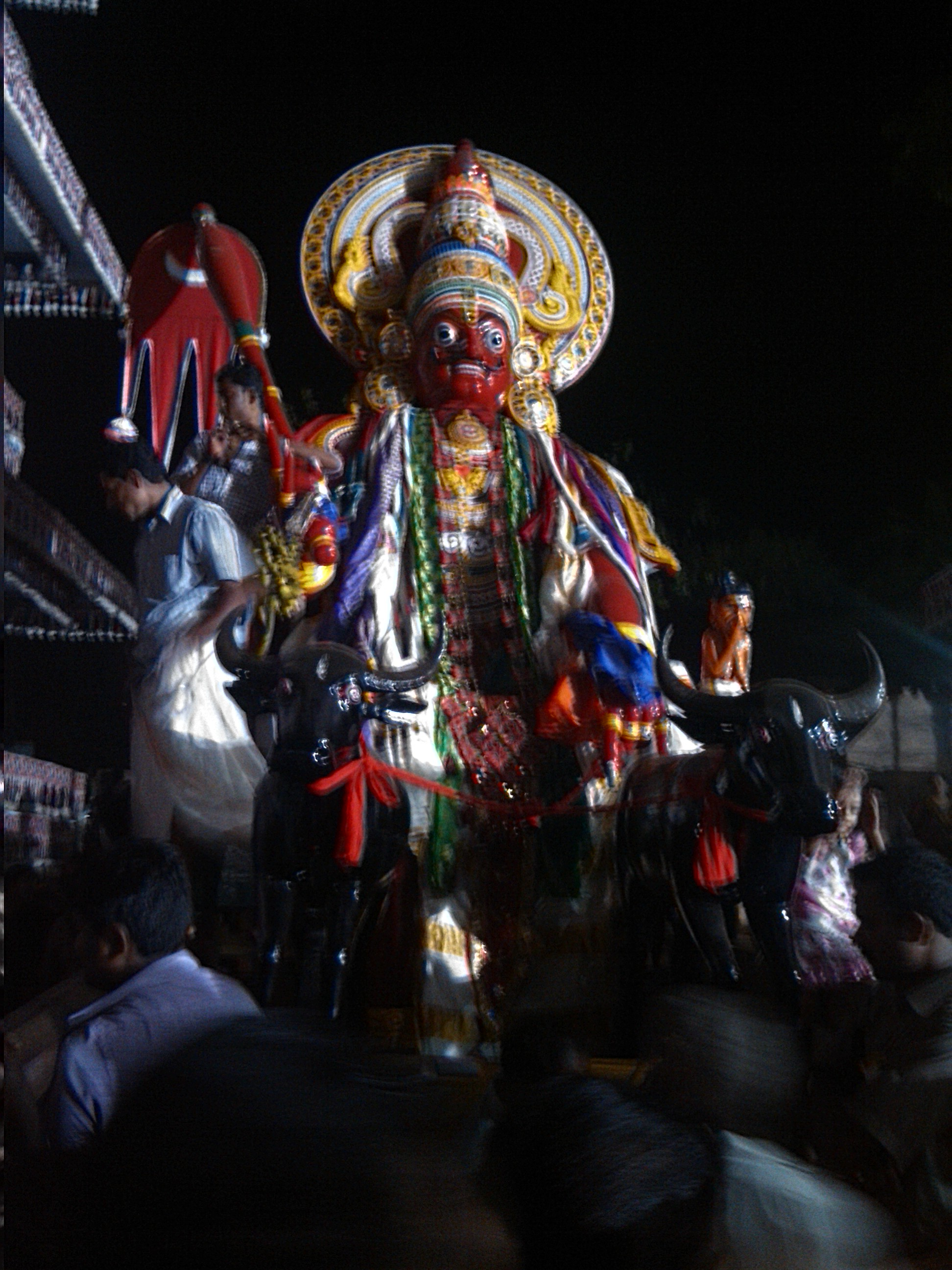
Bhima efiggy from Mattom North

== See also ==
- Temples of Kerala
- Temple festivals of Kerala
