= Chettikulangara =

Village in Kerala, India

- Village
- Nickname: onattukara
- Interactive map of Chettikulangara
- Coordinates: 9.22°N 76.51°E
- Country: India
- State: Kerala
- District: Alappuzha

Government
  - Type: Democratic
  - Body: Grama Panchayat

Languages
  - Official: Malayalam, English
- Time zone: UTC+5:30 (IST)
- Postal code: 690106
- Vehicle registration: KL-31orKL-29
- Website: www.chettikulangara.org

Chettikulangara is a gram panchayat in the Mavelikkara-(6) taluk of the Alappuzha district, state of Kerala, India. Chettikulangara is in "Kayamkulam" legislative assembly (108). It is an area of paddy and sesame fields, and tapioca cultivation. It has many higher secondary schools, a public health center, and a panchayat office. The panchayat is situated on the Mavelikkara-Kayamkulam road. The place is well connected to Kayamkulam, Mavelikkara, Haripad, and other nearby towns.

The Chettikulangara Devi Temple is in Chettikulangara. The Kumbha Bharani festival is conducted during February or March in the temple. The important festivity associated with this utsavam is "Kettu-Kazhcha" which resembles the Chinese festival celebrated on the birthday of Buddha. Kuthiyottam is also another important festivity.

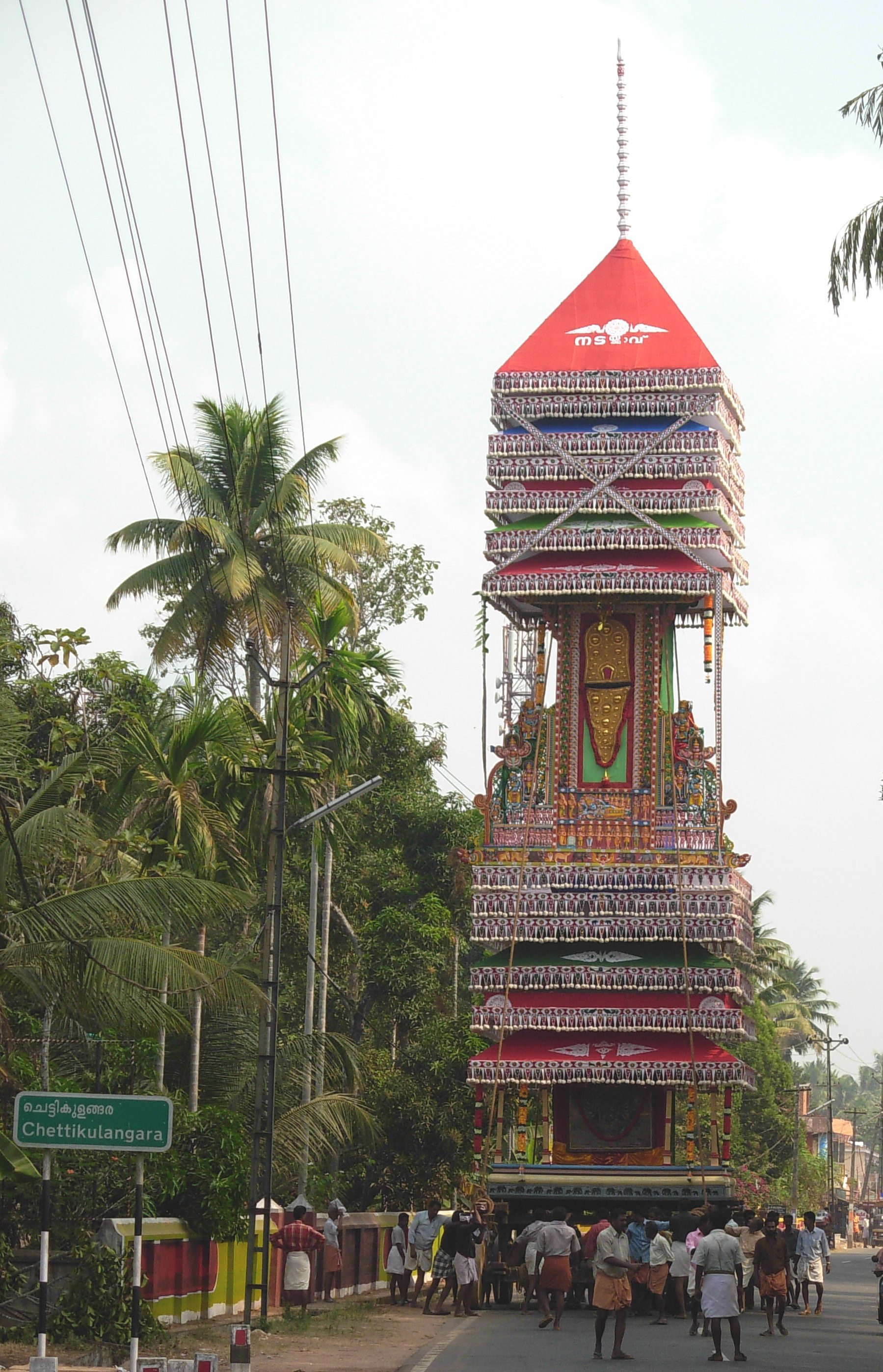
Kettu Kazhcha

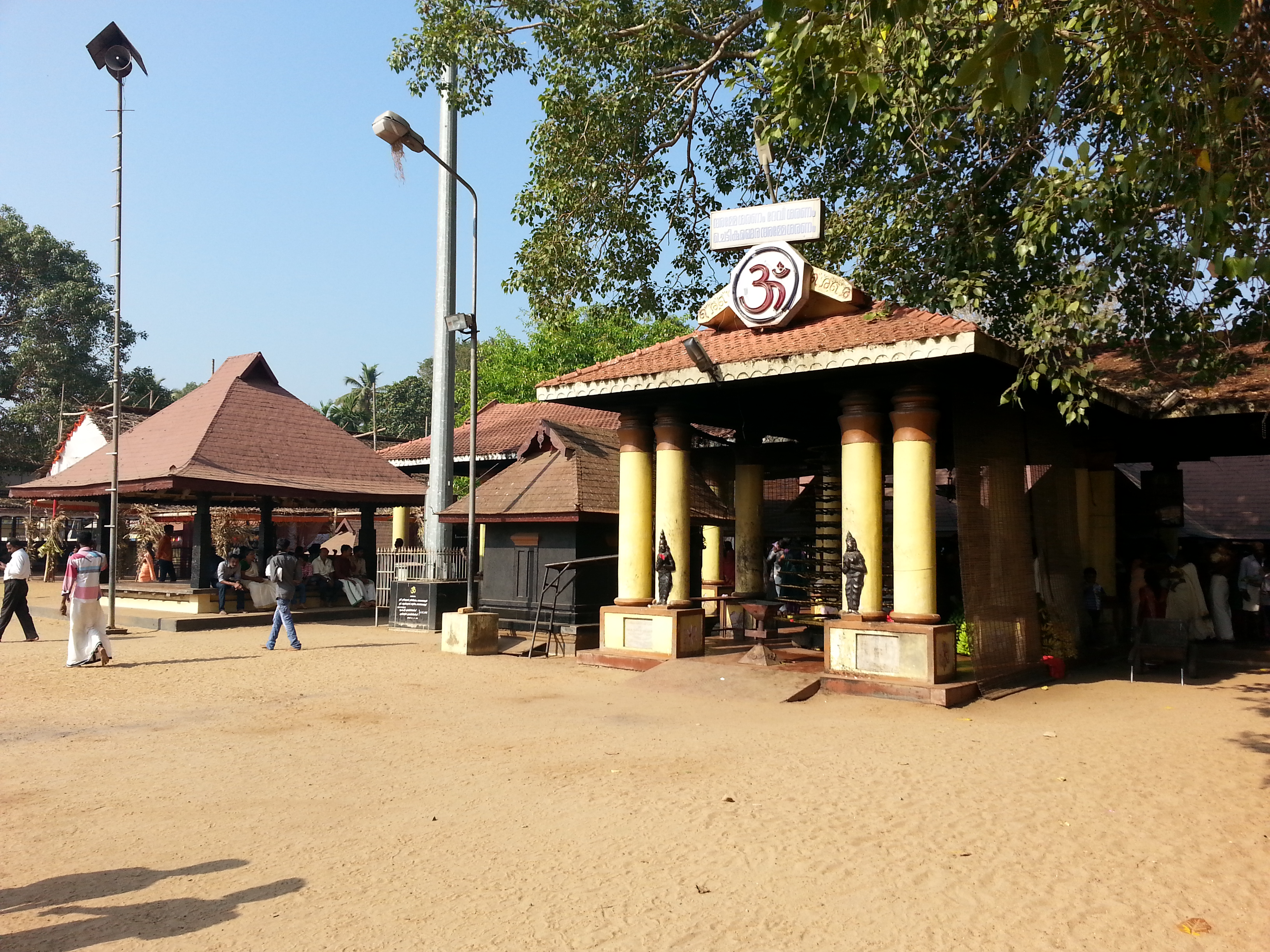
Chettikkulangara temple

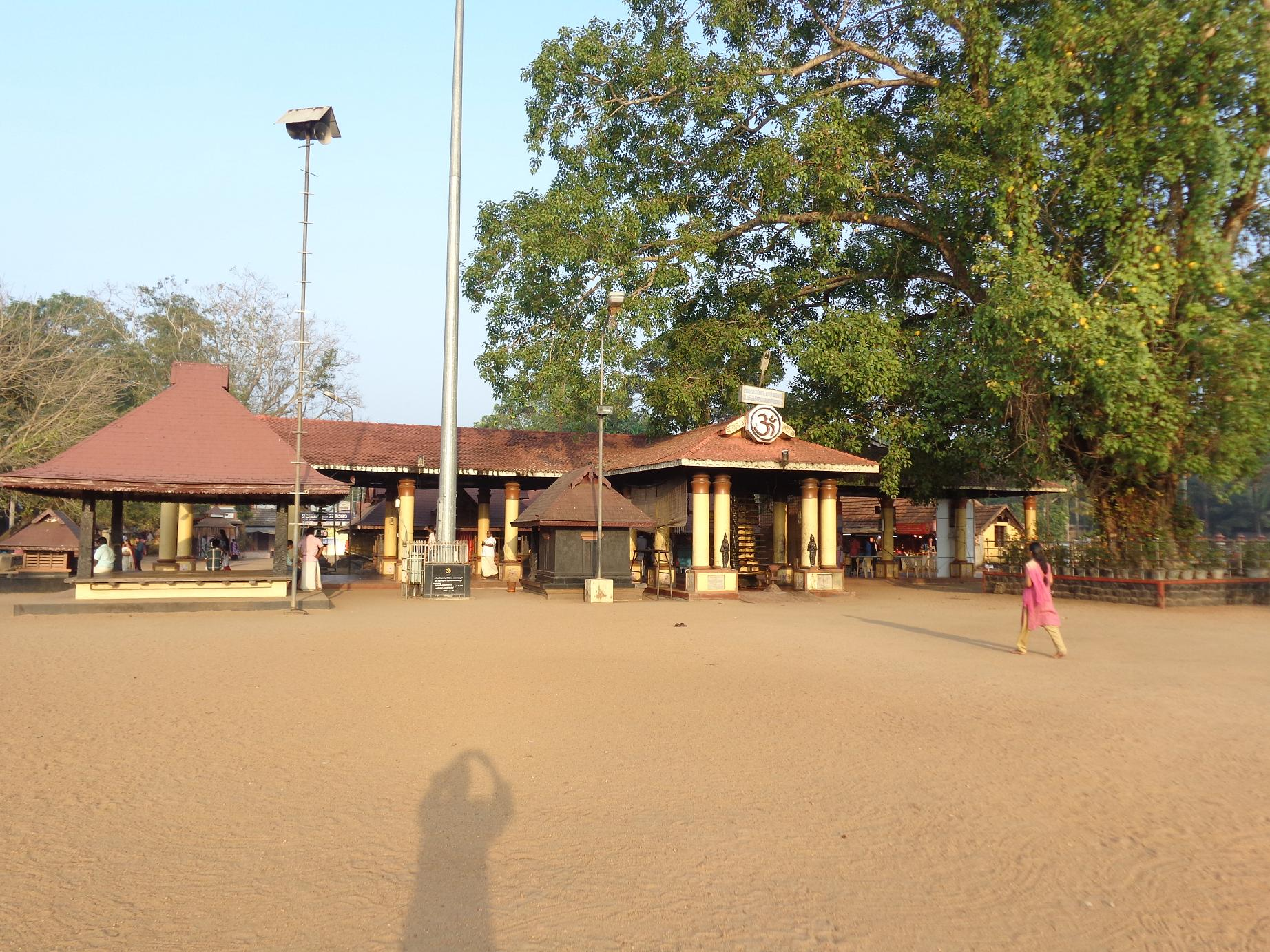
Temple view

Police Station

- Mavelikara Circle↓
- Erezha N
- Karipuzha
- Kannamangalam North
- Pela
- Kaitha North
- Kayamkulam Circle↓
- Menampally
- Erezha S
- Nadakkav
- kaitha S
- Bhagavathipadi

Hospitals

- VSM Hospital, Thattarambalam
- Shreekandapuram, mavelikara
- Panchayat Hospital, Chettikulangara

Pachayath wards

- 1 to 28

Post Offices

- Chettikulangara Main (MVK-6)
- Pela (MVK-3)
- Erezha (MVK-6)
- Kariphzha (MVK-3)
- Kannamgalam South (MVK-6)
