= Chettikulangara Devi Temple =

Hindu temple in Kerala, India

Chettikulangara Sree Bhagavathi temple
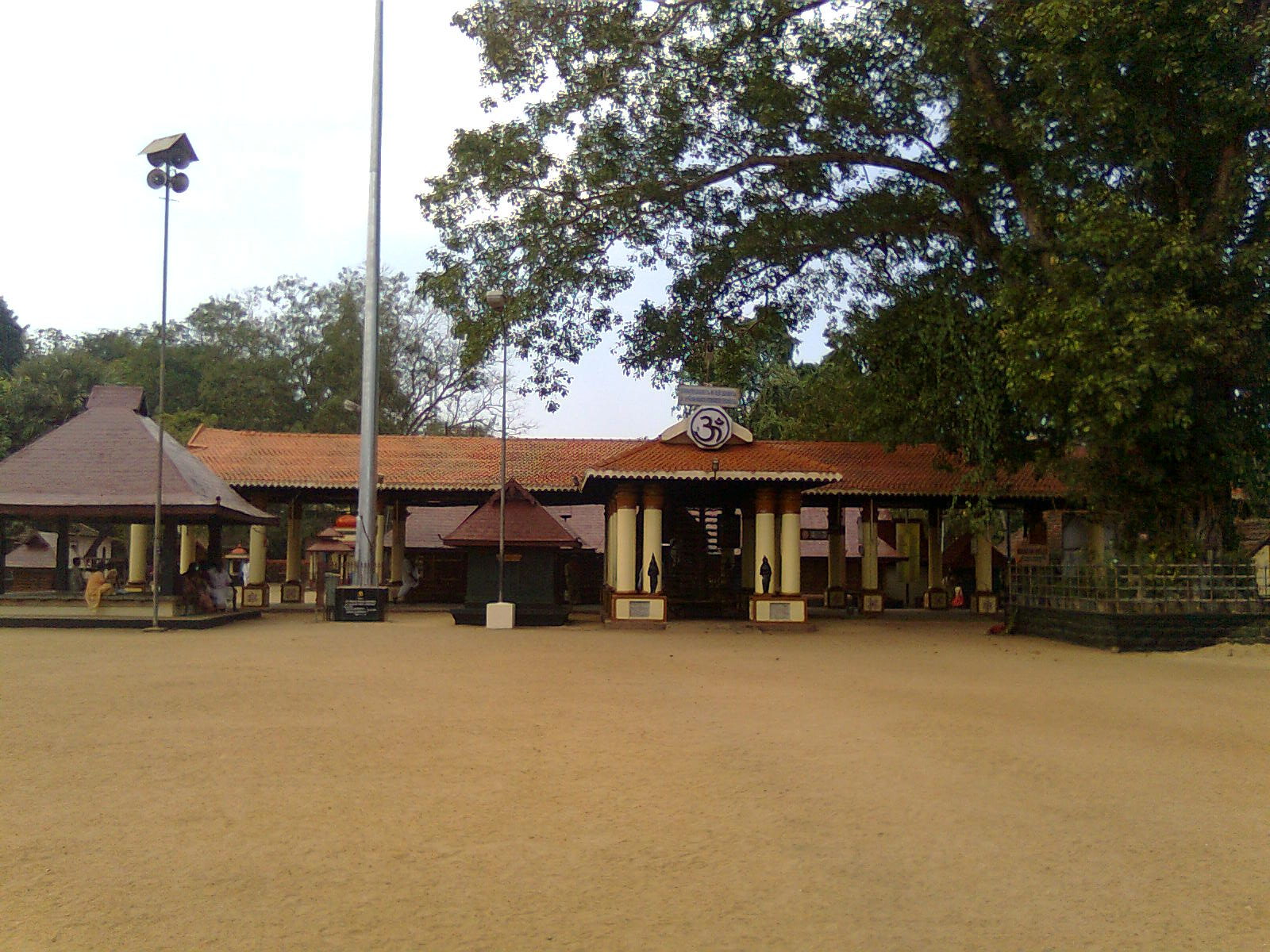

- Sree Bhagavathy Temple, Chettikulangara, Alappuzha, Mavelikara Kerala

Religion
- Affiliation: Hinduism
- District: Alappuzha
- Deity: Bhadrakali, an incarnation of goddess Mahakali from the third eye of Shiva: Chettikulangara Kumbha Bharani; Meena Bharani; Karthika Pongala
- Governing body: Travancore Devaswom Board

Location
- Location: Chettikulangara
- State: Kerala
- Country: India
- Coordinates: 9.227626°N 76.517226°E

Architecture
- Type: Traditional Kerala style
- Completed: Records indicate the temple to be at least 1200 years old

Specifications
- Temple: One
- Elevation: 30.22 m (99 ft)

Chettikulangara Sree Bhagavathi temple is one of the most renowned Hindu temples in Kerala. Main deity is Sree Bhadrakali. The temple is located at Chettikulangara in Alappuzha district in the Indian state of Kerala. The temple is situated about 4 kilometres (2.5 miles) west of Mavelikkara and 7 kilometres (4.3 miles) north of Kayamkulam on SH6 (Kayamkulam - Thiruvalla Highway). Bhadrakali, is an incarnation of supreme mother Shakthi devi, born from the third eye of Lord Shiva, to kill the demon king Daruka. 'Bhadra' means good and 'Kali' means goddess of time. So Bhadrakali is worshipped for prosperity and salvation. Devi is considered as the creator, protector, destructor, nature, power and Kundalini Shakthi.

== Overview ==
Chettikulangara devi is the supreme mother goddess, Shakthi devi in Hinduism.

The temple has 13 "Karas", or territories. The temple is at the centre of the oldest four Karas (Erezha South, Erezha North, Kaitha South and Kaitha North) and the rest of the Karas (Kannamangalam South, Kannamangalam North, Pela, Kadavoor, Anjilipra, Mattam North, Mattam South, Menampally and Nadakkavu) surround the temple, which is believed to be 1,200 years old.

The Thantric rights of the temple belongs to Plackudy Illom, With its Tharavadu (Base) in Ambalapuzha. Plackudy is one among the ancient Thantric families of Kerala. The Present temple Thanthric charge is for Brahmasri. Plackudy Unnikrishnan Namboothiri.

Recently UNESCO collected details about the temple and its customs (Kuthiyottam, Kumbha Bharani) in order to examine whether the temple is eligible for inclusion in the UNESCO World Heritage List.

This is the second largest temple in terms of income under the control of Travancore Devaswom Board, second only next to Sabarimala. It is estimated that the temple has earnings worth many crores per year. In 2009 it earned around 1.7 crore Rupees from a single type of offering called "Chanthattam". A major part of the Nellu (whole rice grain) offered to the Bhagavathi is also used to make Appam and Aravana prasadams at Sabarimala. The income from the temple is also helpful to run the daily rituals and Poojas at various temples under the Travancore Devaswom Board.

Kuthiramoottil kanji and Therummoottil kanji, are major offerings at Chettikulangara Devi temple, which received the Geographical Indication (GI) tags. Ten other names associated with the temple have been registered under the trademark and patents regime. These include Chettikulangara Amma, Chettikulangara Kumbha Bharani, Chettikulangara Kettukazhcha, Kuthiyottam, and Chooralmuriyal. The registration under the rules of protection of intellectual property rights has been made in the name of Sree Devi Vilasam Hindu Matha Convention, Chettikulangara, an organisation of 13 karas or regional societies. The organisation has also applied for design patent for kuthira and theru as well as Jeevatha, the deity's palanquin. There are Similar Kettukazhcha at various temples in this Onattukara Area. Kumbha Bharani festival of this temple is being attracted by lakhs of people every year.

== Early history ==
There are many popular beliefs related to the origin of Chettikulangara temple. The most popular one is as follows. Many centuries ago, some local chieftains went to witness the annual festivities at the Koypallikarazhma Bhagavathi temple situated a few kilometers from Chettikulangara. The visitors were humiliated and ridiculed by the Koypallikarazhma temple authorities and the village chieftains there. Perturbed by the humiliation, and out of retribution, they decided to construct a Bhagavathi temple at Chettikulangara. People of Chettikulangara united for this cause, and headed by the Karanavars (Family Heads) of the leading families of the region - mainly Chembolil Thangal, Puthupurakkal Unnithan, Kaitha Thekku Mangattachan and Mecheril Panickar, decided to seek the blessings of Kodungallur Bhagavathi in this mission. They embarked on a pilgrimage visiting various temples en route and reached Kodungallur, and performed Bhajanam for 12 days to please the Goddess. It is said that the Devi came in their dreams to say that she would soon come to Chettikulangara. The next day, they happily returned to Chettikulangara with a sacred sword given by the Velichappadu of Kodungallur temple, and started civil works of the temple.

A few days later, while the kadathukaran (local boatman) of the nearby Karippuzha rivulet was winding up his work on a late evening, he heard an old woman requesting his help to ferry her to the other shore. He felt it was his duty to help this lonely lady, and decided to accompany her to Chettikulangara, the destination she was said to be heading for. On the way, they took rest beneath a wayside tree (the place now houses the Puthusseriambalam temple), and the Kadathukaran brought food for them from a nearby [mannan/washer man] house. Soon he fell asleep, and when he woke up by early daybreak, the lady had vanished. (It is said that this boatman was a Christian, and for helping Devi to ferry across the Karippuzha thodu, the descendants of his family were entrusted with the job of Vedi (ritual fireworks at the temple). He elaborated about this mysterious incident to the people of Chettikulangara, and they felt the Devi had reached Chettikulangara.

The next day, annual maintenance works on thatched roof was going on at the illam (the traditional house where a community of Brahmins in central Kerala reside) adjacent to the present temple. While the Antharjanam of the house was serving the dish of Kanji (rice porridge) muthirapuzhukku (a local special dish with ingredients of baked Horse Gram cereal and kneaded coconut) and Asthram (another side dish, a paste of different locally procured vegetables) for the workers, a strange old woman joined them for lunch. Soon after the food, the old lady moved to the western side of the house, and vanished in thin air with a bright glow. Antharjanam witnessed this, and she fell unconscious. Later she elaborated her experience to the people.

The same day, Devi showed her presence to the village chieftains. They approached famous astrologers, it was confirmed that the Bhagavathi had reached Chettikulangara.

According to one version, this temple was consecrated by Padmapadacharyar (a leading disciple of Adi Shankara) on the Uthrittathi (Uttara Bhadrapada) day of Makara month in 823 CE. There is a firm argument that the goddess here was a family deity, and later emerged as the village and regional deity. Local historians oppose the argument that the temple is not as ancient as the nearby Kandiyoor Mahadeva temple or Mavelikara Krishna Swamy temple as it had not been mentioned in Unnuneeli Sandesam written in the 14th century. According to late Kandiyoor Mahadeva Shasthri, Samudra Bandhan–a leading courtier of Ravi Varman, an ancient King of Venad had visited this temple and wrote poems on Bhagavathi. Similarly, they argue that Aadithya Kulasekharan, the King of Venad (1374 to 1389 CE) also visited the Chettkulangara temple. In addition, one argument favours the notion that this Devi temple was an old kavu where Kadmattath kathanaar achan, on his way to nearby panayanarkavu at parumala from Thevalakara, tried to control a Yakshi (female spirit) and found no place to give her a stay. He came and prayed to the God and was able to control her. (she's still there in the temple compound). However, it is to be said that the present Sreekovil of the temple is only 450–480 years old, and the Chuttambalam is not more than two centuries old. Local historians say that the temple infrastructure and the surroundings were developed by various local chieftains from time to time. The present Sreekoil was revamped during 1540 CE. Because of a small fire at this temple, the Chuttambalam was slightly modified during the Malayalam year 1002.

It is also believed that Chettikulangara Amma (the main deity) is the daughter of Kodungallur Amma, brought to that place for the well being of all people at Onattukara (Mavelikara). And it also says that some Chettyar families from Tamil Nadu was related to the name Chettikulangara.

== Sub-deities ==
There are many Upadevathas (sub-deities) adjacent to the temple, and a few Prathishtas were either revamped or added according to the Deva Prashnam by expert astrologers recently.

The main Upadevathas in the temple premises are

- Yakshini
- Ganapathi
- Nagarajav
- Balakan
- Muhurthi
- Naga Yakshi
- Thevara Moorthy
- Kannamballi bhagavathi
- Rekshas (a fierce supernatural creature who feeds on humans)
- Vallyachan (Central Travancore parlance for family chieftains; they are worshiped by his descendants after death)

There is a small temple for Moolasthanam (primary abode).

A Kavu (a patch of small forest which houses the serpent Gods, and is common in central Travancore). A Karimbana and Chembakam tree on the premises are places of worship on the belief that they house Gandharvas and Yakshis, the supernatural elements who accompany Bhagavathy, their master, during her trips, termed Varuthu Pokku in local parlance.

As followed for many centuries, elephants are not taken to the western side of the Nalambalam, fearing that the fairy creatures residing at the Chembakam may kill them.

== Festivals ==
The Temple has a number of festivals. The important ones are

=== Parayeduppu ===
In the numerous temples of Onattukara, the "Parayeduppu" period is the festival season. It all begins when the deity ("Devi") of Chettikulangara temple is taken out in procession for Parayeduppu on the Makayriam star of the Malayalam month Makaram. The festivals continue to the end of Meenam. The main part of Parayeduppu is the Jeevatha constructed in the model of the temple structure itself. This box-like carriage for the deity rests on two teakwood poles about two meters long, and is in the form of a palanquin . The front resembles "Thidambu" behind which is a kind of pettakam (small chest) built as per Thachusaasthra calculations. Up front is a woollen cloth embroidered with shining, colourful pictures and gold trinkets. Behind that is kept the deity's holy dress, starched and pleated, and decorated with small mirror pieces. More than 100 families form the entourage of Parayeduppu Bhagavathy's - three-month-long visit to the homes of people who lives in her Karas

The rhythms used during Jeevatha Ezunnallathu (procession) are quite noteworthy. Starting with very slow beats, it builds up a crescendo and ends in fast beats. The ensemble consists of Veekkan chenda, Uruttu chenda (both drums), Elathaalam (cymbals).

Although Jeevatha Ezunnallathu and Parayeduppu are centuries old customs, the "Chuvadu Vechu Kali" (a peculiar dance with unique steps) is recent.

=== Kumbha Bharani ===
The major festival at Chettikulangara is Kumbha Bharani. This is in the month of February or March. The date is determined according to the Malayalam Calendar KollaVarsham. The Chettikulangara Bharani is celebrated in the month of Kumbha and on the day which has the star Bharani and hence the name Kumbha Bharani. The highlight of the festival is Kuthiyottam and Kettukazhcha.

The preparation for Kumbha Bharani starts 7(seven) days before the actual day and usually that day will be the Shivarathi. People who had pledged for Kuthiyottam will start training their children for the offering on Shivarathi day. All these days these people will host public get-togethers and arrange food for them. The children will be taught a special dance steps called Kuthiyota chuvadukal. Meanwhile, the people from 13 karas of chettikulangara will arrange for the construction of their Kettukazhcha to the temple.

The Kuthiyottam processions starts early morning on that day and will last until afternoon. Those who had offered Kuthiyottam to Devi will bring their children to the temple as a procession and will offer the children before Devi as sacrifice. The boys will be playing the Kuthiyootam dance before the Devi. During the evening hours it will be turn of the Kettukazhcha. People from each area will pull the Kettukazhcha from the construction sites (usually in their respective karas itself) to the temple to present them before the Devi and after having darshan the parties take up their respective position in the paddy fields lying east of the temple

During the night, the image of Devi will be carried in procession to the Kettukazhcha stationed in the paddy fields. On the next day these structures will be taken back. A big bazaar known as Bharani Chanda is also held at Chetikulangara as part of this festival.

=== Ethirelpu Ulsavam ===
This is the annual temple festival. On the tenth day following the Kumbha Bharani the annual festival is celebrated in the temple for 13 days. Each day of the festival is organized by residents of each Kara numbering 13. special rituals are held in the temple premises. Every afternoon, cultural processions start form each Kara to the temple premises, with the accompaniment of drums, ornamented umbrellas, kuthiyottam songs, display of events from the Mahabharatha and the Ramayana, classical art forms, folk art form, different type of music, decorated structures and caparisoned elephants.

During the rituals at the temple Thottampattu is sung. Thottampattu is a devotional song sung by a certain section of the community residing in the far off Trivandrum. This song is sung in the temple only during the Etheralpu festival.

Performance of classical arts and other temple arts are conducted in the evening in the temple premises.

=== Aswathy Ulsavam ===
The unique rituals during the Aswathy festival clearly convey the firm bondage and human pathos at the time of separation between the people and their beloved Bhagavathy. Held in the Aswathy day in the month of Meenom, this festival is attracting a large number of visitors. This festival is imagined as a send off to the deity on her journey to visit her mother at Kodungallur. In the evening, 100 odd decorated [Kettukazhcha] and different effigies are brought to the temple mainly made by the children. Though the size of these Kettukazhcha are comparatively smaller than the ones made for Bharani festival, the number of Kettukazhcha provide a visual impact even challenging the aesthetic effect of Bharani. During the day, Bhagavathy visits the four karas surrounding the temple for Parayeduppu and official Anpolis are given by Kara leaders at Kuthirachevudu, the place where Kuthiras are made. After that she visits and blesses the offerings displayed at the temple premises.

By dawn, she decides to leave, and seeks their permission to leave for Kodungallur. The people of the first four karas make Polavilakku (a large structure drawn on wheels decorated with tender banana stem and lighted with numerous traditional lamps) during her farewell procession. They offer her a grand farewell procession with Aappindi [a unique slow-paced dance carrying a pyramid shape box on head). Aappindi will be embellished with crackers, pookkula (cluster of coconut flowers - inflorescence), and will be covered with tender banana stems and Thalapppoli (traditional sacred lamps carried by ladies).

People from Kaitha North and Kaitha South participate in the function with Thiruvantham. It is said that Thiruvantham, a palanquin type structure with fireballs and carried by four people, is the light of Darika, which incenses the Bhagavathy. She scares them away. After the procession, she again visits the Upaprathishtas and asks the people and other gods to let her visit her mother at Kodungallur.

By dawn, she proceeds with lightning sped towards west. Normally, within the 100 meters, the Poojaris carrying the Jeevatha will fall down unconsciously, and the Jeevatha will be taken back to the temple.

The temple will remain closed for the day, and will be opened only the day after. The Aswathy festival concludes the five-month-long festivities at this temple.

== Kettukazhcha ==
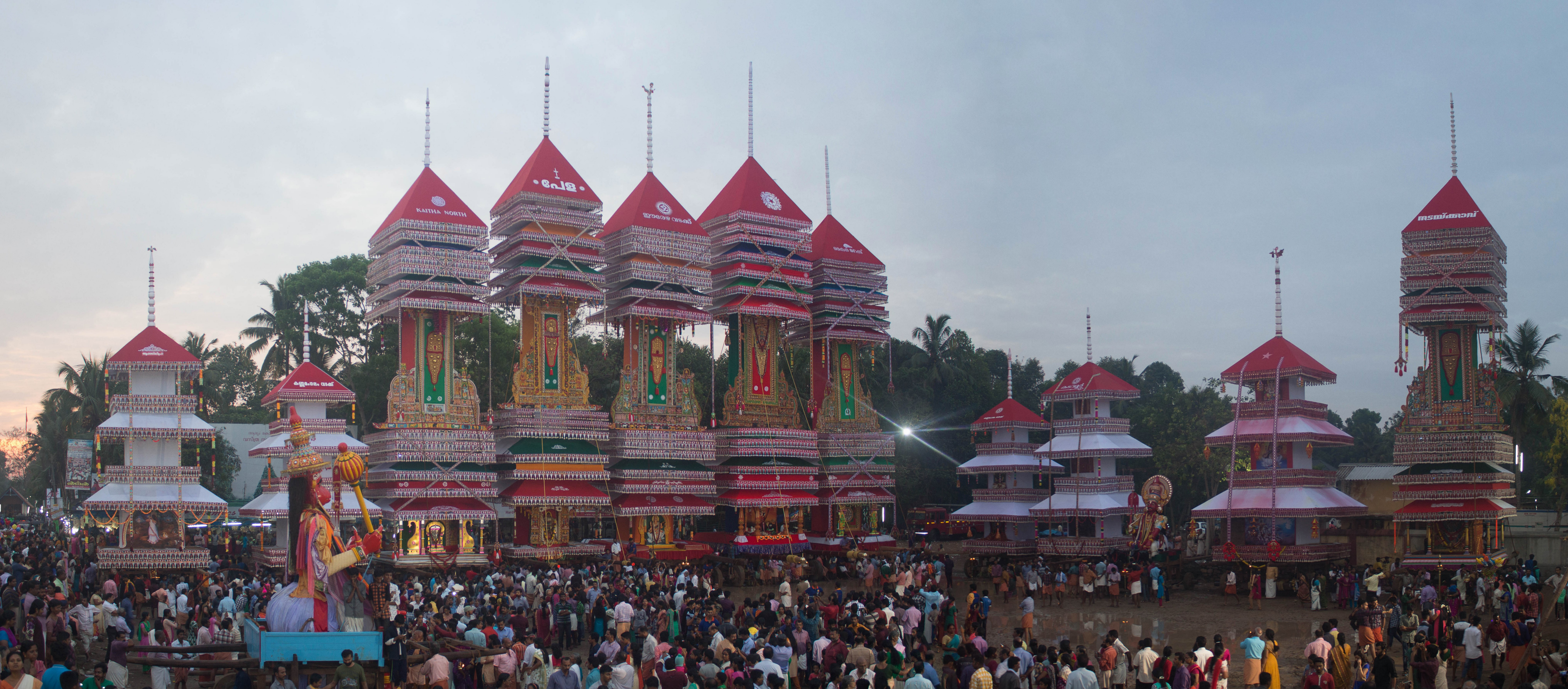
2017 Chettikulangara Kettukazcha panorama

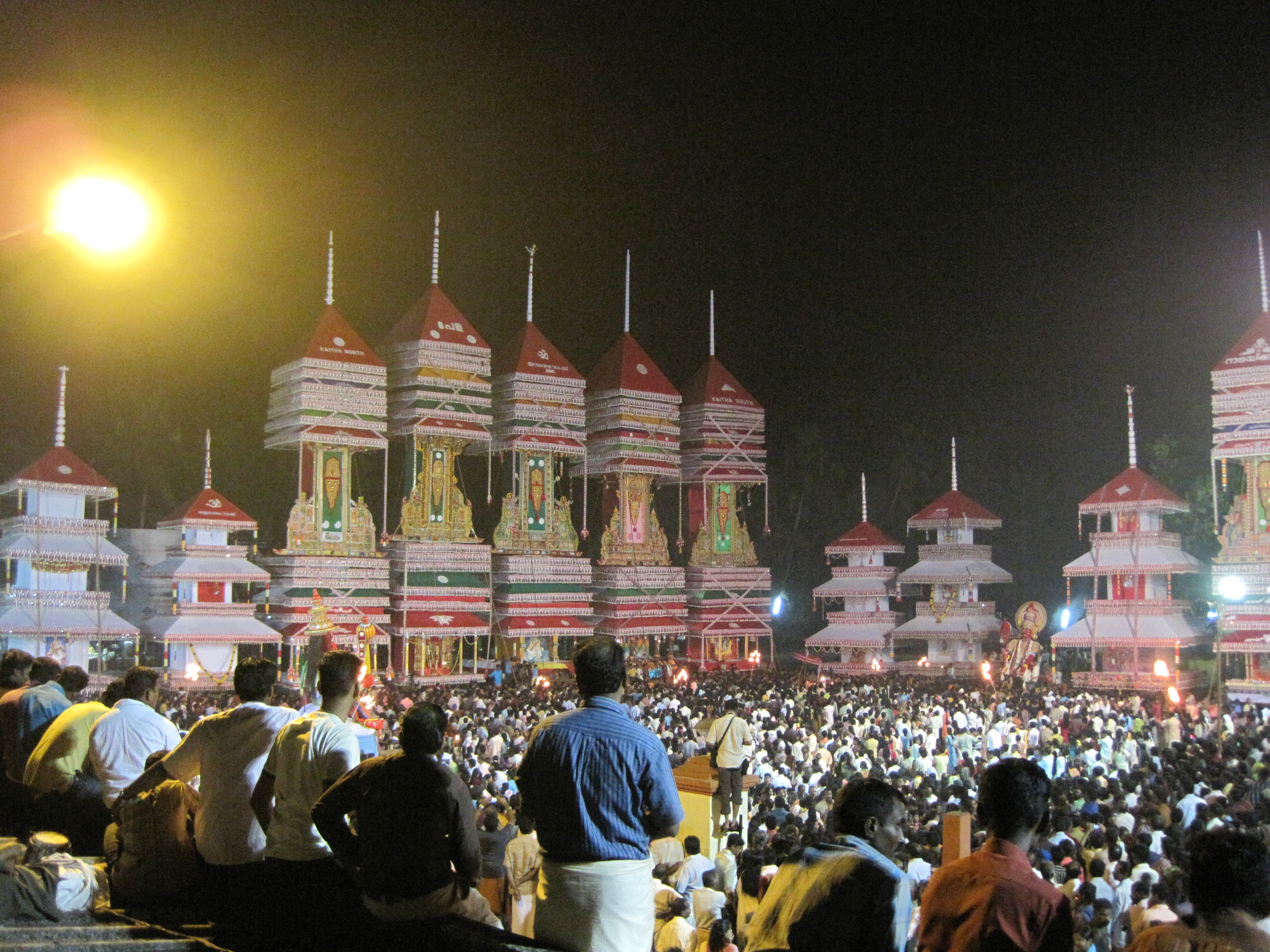
Kettukazhcha

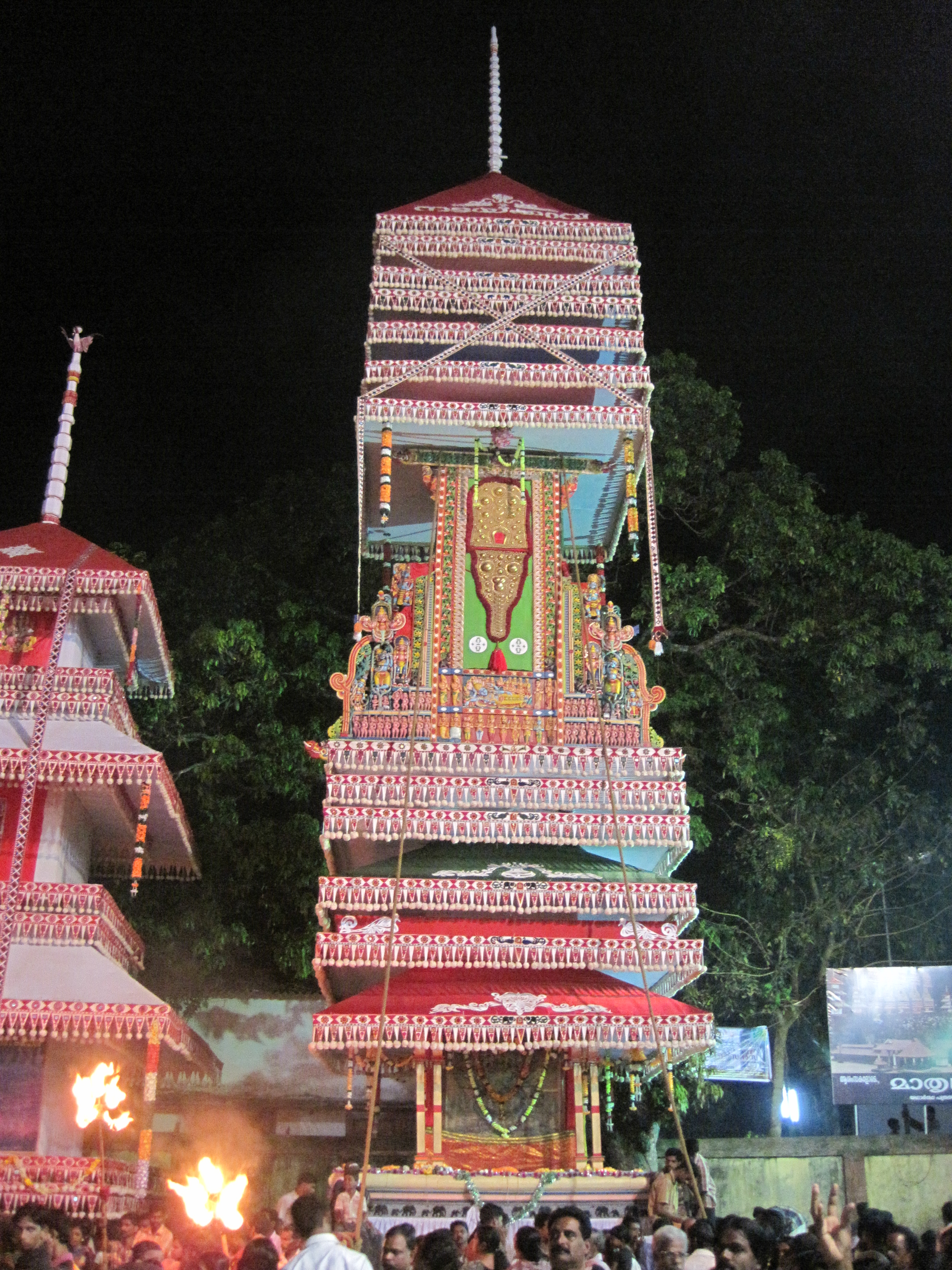
kuthira

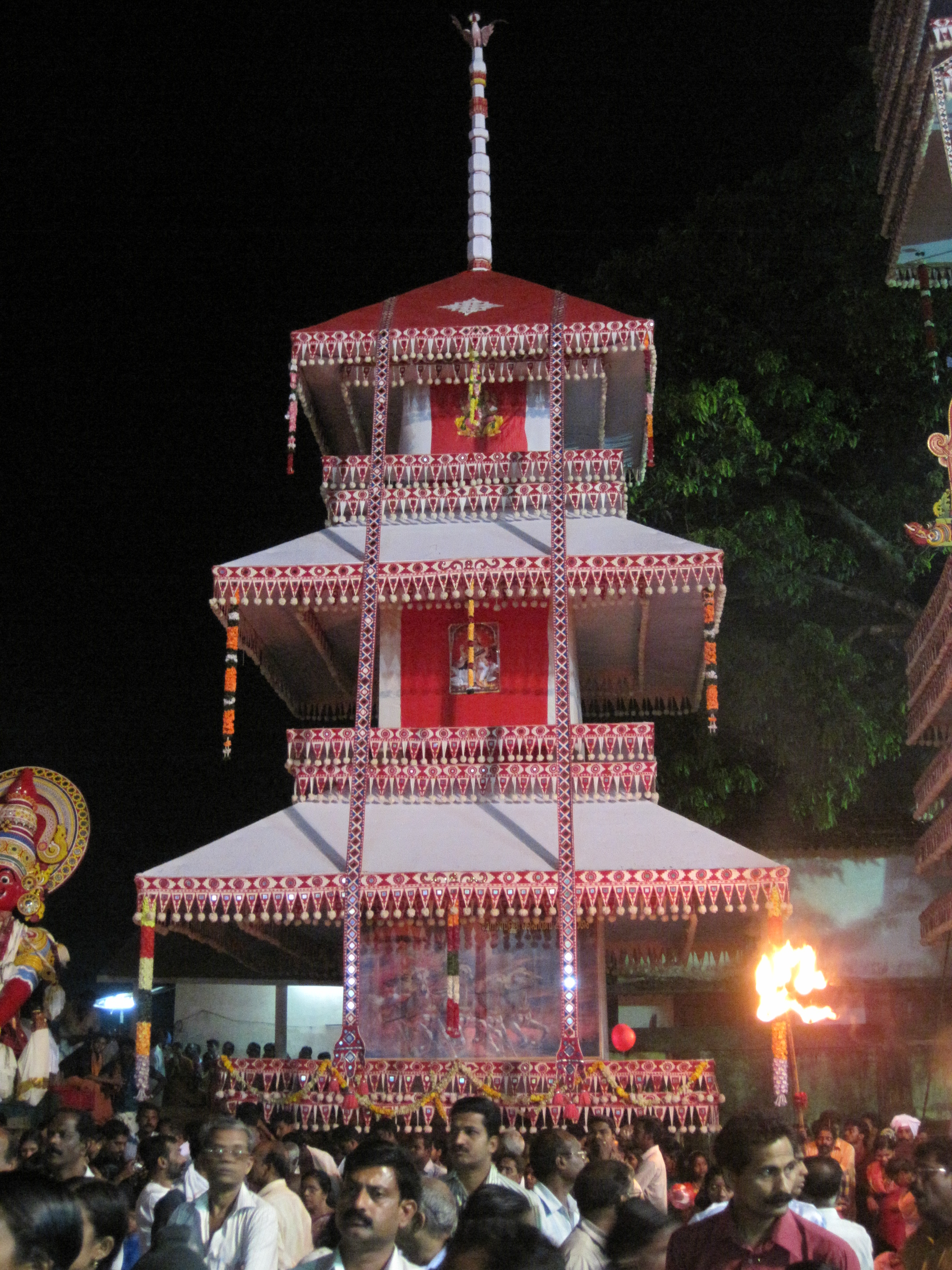
Theru

Kettukazhcha is an offering of the people of Chettikulangara to their deity known for her blessings on true devotees as a mark of gratitude, devotion, unflinching faith, and for showering prosperity and protection to their lives. Kettukazhcha displays sculpted and decorated forms of six temple cars known as 'Kuthira' (Horses), five 'Theru' (Chariots ) and icons of Bhima and Hanuman. All the temple cars, chariots and the icons are large structures, many times larger than any other similar Kuthiras and Therus built during the festivities at other temples in the Central Travancore region. The structures are paraded during the festival and their decoration forms are prominent during the night in the back drop of illuminated lights. Chettikulangara Kettukazhcha heralds the architectural and artistic acumen of the ancient people of Chettikulangara, who brought these concepts to reality by collective contributions.

Lineage according to historians

Many historians cite that the famous Chettikulangara Kettukazhcha in the present form is not more than 180 to 200 years old, and was started during the early part of the 19th century.

According to a popular legend, a group of village chieftains and their workers went for civil works to construct the Kollam–Chavara Thodu (canal), about 50 km away from Chettikulangara, in accordance to the decision from the then ruler of the region. But they could not return to their native place due to the unforeseen inordinate delay in completion of the canal. They pleaded with the authorities, but their request was turned down. During the period, they got an opportunity to visit the temple festivities at Kollam Mulankagakam temple, and were attracted by the Kettukazhcha there. They vowed to their local deity Chettikulangara Bhagavathy, that they would construct Kettukazhchas for her every year, if they were allowed to leave for Chettkulangara immediately. To their surprise, they were allowed to return to Chettikulangara the very next day, and as promised, they made huge Kettukazhchas and took them to their Bhagavathy's premises.

Kuthiras

Kuthiras have a height of about 70 to 105 feet, and are a union of four parts– Adikkoottu, Kathirakal, Edakkodaram, Prabhada and Melkkoodaram, one above the other respectively.

Adikkottu the basic structure also known as Vandikkoottu, form the basic foundation which consists of four big wooden wheels interconnected with four other beams above it. Kuthiras have Thandu, two long huge wooden poles helpful to control the direction while on the move. Thandu and the basic structure are interconnected and have reinforced wooden bearings similar to the modern shock absorbers.

Kathirukal with about 35 feet height, consists of four long poles interconnected with Arecanut poles known as ‘Alaku’ and reinforced with coir and Panavalli knots. These are again strengthened with ‘Kuthukathrika’ or criss cross formation of Alakus. Kathirakal is again bifurcated to two parts–the lower portion consisting of four to five extended layers of Thattu and Charippu (slanting pyramid shaped boxes, made of interconnected Alakus and coir formation, then decorated with white cloth known as Vella, colourful glittering clothes and embellishments called ‘Thookku’.

Prabhada consists of exquisite wooden carved sculptors narrating stories from the Puranas, elephant caparisons called Nettipattoms, Thalekkettu and Aalavattom displayed in the backdrop of colourful clothes and sculptors. Many of the Prabhadas have stories like Gajendramoksham, Vasthrapaharanam, Krishnavatharm.

Edakkoodaram almost half the size of Kathirakal with four to five Charippu made as in the lower portion, comes above the Kathirakal. It also has glittering different clothes and Vella, interlaced with colourful Thookku embellishments.

Melkkoodaramthe top structure is exactly having a pyramid shape, and pivotal to it is an extended long sculpted wooden pole in white colour known as ‘Nambu’. All the separate units are pulled up and placed one above the other with the help of wooden pulleys, giant coir ropes called Vadams with a length of over 100 fts.and with huge iron structures, drawn by hundreds of people.

Theru

Theru does not have the Prabhadas and Edakkoodarams. Their Illithattu and Charippu are larger than that of the Kuthiras and diminishes in size upwards. Therus are also smaller than the Kuthiras height.

Bhima and Hanuman The wooden icons of Bhima made by Mattom North and Hanuman brought by Mattom south are probably the largest of its kind in the world, and are sure to be the largest in Kerala. Bhima's icon is postured as the Pandava en route to kill Baka on Pothu Vandi (vehicle drawn by buffalos) with food for the Rakshasa King. Mattom south kara also brings the icon of Panjali along with Hanuman

Preparations for constructing the Kettukazhchas start from Shivarathri, about six to ten days prior to Kumbhabharani. On the evening of Kumbhabharani, the Kettukazhchas are dragged to the temple by hundreds of people, and are paraded at the paddy field in front of the temple. After Bhagavathi's Ezhunnellippu to bless the Kettukazhchas and people, the Kettukazhchas are taken back to the respective Karas by next morning. The dismantled parts of Kettukazhchas are kept at the 'Kuthirappura' of each Karas.

== Kuthiyottam ==
Kuthiyottam is performed as an important offering to the deity. This is a ritual dance practiced and perfected through several centuries. It used to be done only in houses in the 13 Karas of the Chettikulangara Temple but after a recent Deva Prashnam it was allowed to conduct Kuthiyottam in the houses outside of the 13 Karas. The houses are decorated, and the portrait of the deity is installed in temporary structures. Kuthiyottam starts a week before Bharani day. It is a type of folk dance performed by youths with the accompaniment of folk music and other musical instruments. Young boys between 8 and 14 years are taught this ritual dance in the house amidst a big social gathering before the portrait of the deity. Feasts are also provided for all the people.

Early in the morning on Bharani, after the feast and other rituals, the boys whose bodies are coiled with silver wires, one end of which is tied around his neck and an arecanut fixed on the tip of a knife held high over his head are taken in procession to the temple with the accompaniment of beating of drums, music, ornamental umbrellas, and other classical folk art forms, and richly caparisoned elephants.

All through the way to the temple tender coconut water will be continually poured on his body. After the circumambulation the boys stands at a position facing the Sreekovil (Sanctum Sanctorum) and begins to dance. This ceremony ends with dragging the coil pierced to the skin whereby a few drop of blood comes out.

== See also ==
- Temples of Kerala
- Onattukara
- Mavelikara
- Chettikulangara Kumbha Bharani
