= Nettipattom =

Decorative ornament for elephants in India

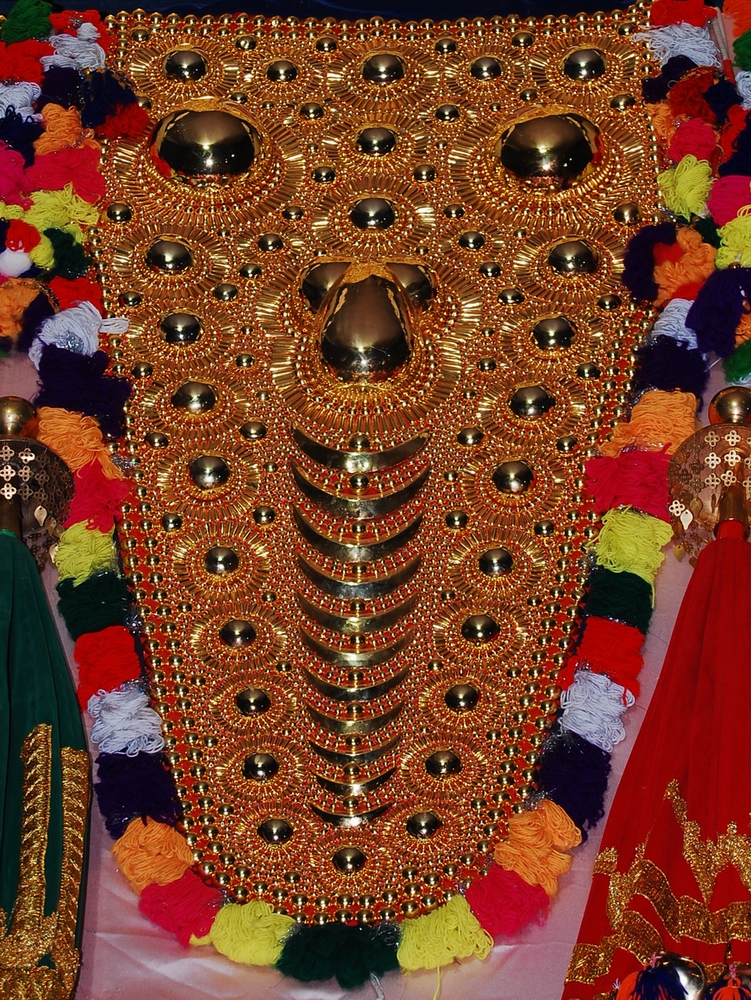

Nettipattam is an ornament used in Kerala to adorn the forehead of temple Elephants during Temple festivals and other auspicious events. Nettipattam is often translated into English as an elephant caparison. Nettipattam is made with Gold and Copper. It is an integral part of Kerala culture. The Legend has it that Lord Brahma was the first divinity to design a forehead embellishment for Lord Indra's white war elephant, the Airavata.

Each bubble depicts pancha-bhoothas, thrimoorthies, navagrahas, ashta-vasus, saptarishis, moola-ganapathi etc. It is widely used on auspicious occasions since its believed that Nettipattam brings prosperity, peace and blessings. There are different types of Nettipattam like Chooralpoli, Nagapadam, Vendod, etc. Nettipattam are mainly of three types—chooralpoli, nagapadam and vandodu.

== Etymology ==
'Nettipattam' is a combination of two Malayali words: 'Netti' (forehead) and 'Pattom' (band).

== History ==
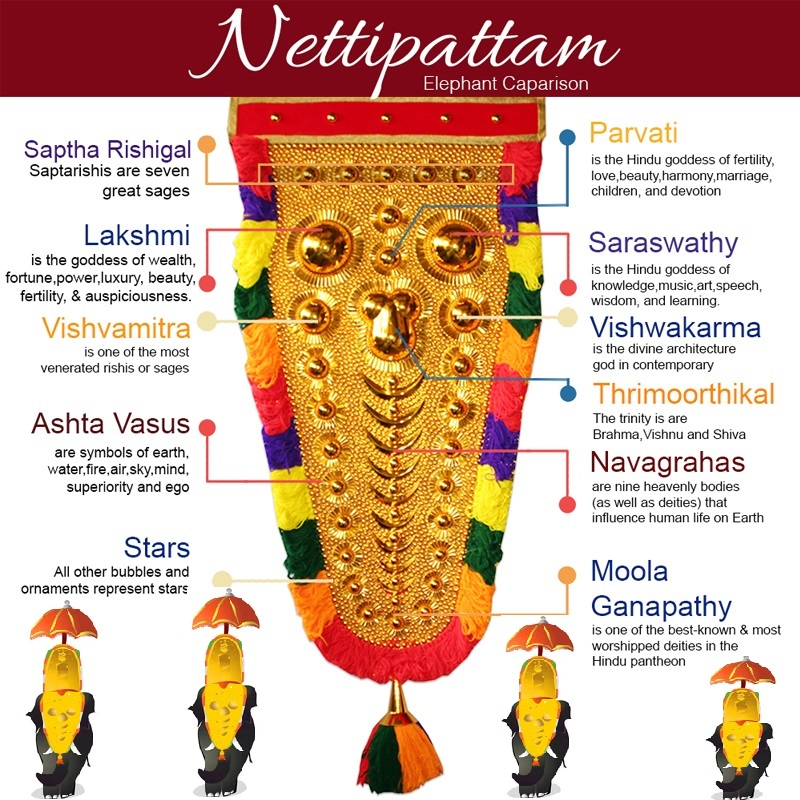
Elephant Caparison - Nettipattam Details

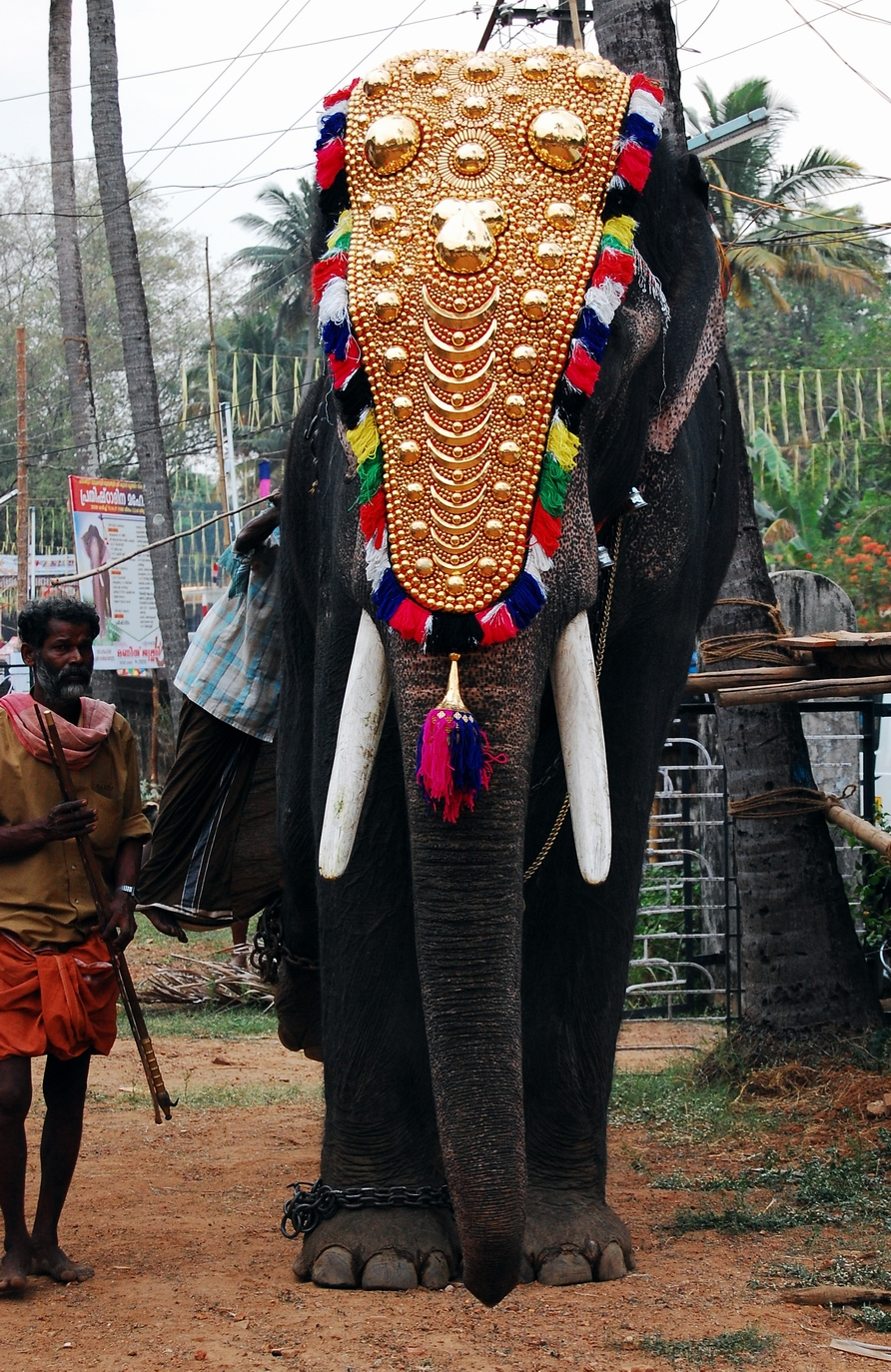
An elephant wearing Nettipattom

According to the legend, in Hindu mythology, Lord Brahma was the first divinity to design a forehead Ornament for Lord Indra's war elephant, the Airavata.

== Production ==
Nettipattom is mostly made in Thrissur. Thrippunithura is another place where it is made. It is made by stitching metals balls in special shapes into cotton and jute sacks. Mostly it is made in Copper. Brass is also used although rarely. Be it copper or brass, it is later painted with gold for the yellow shine.

Nettipattom is a complex ornament. It has 11 objects in the shape of half moon, a pointed object called Koomban kinnam, 2 round ones, 37 half balls, 40 full balls, 1 kalanji and 5000 small bubbles inside it.

== Gallery ==
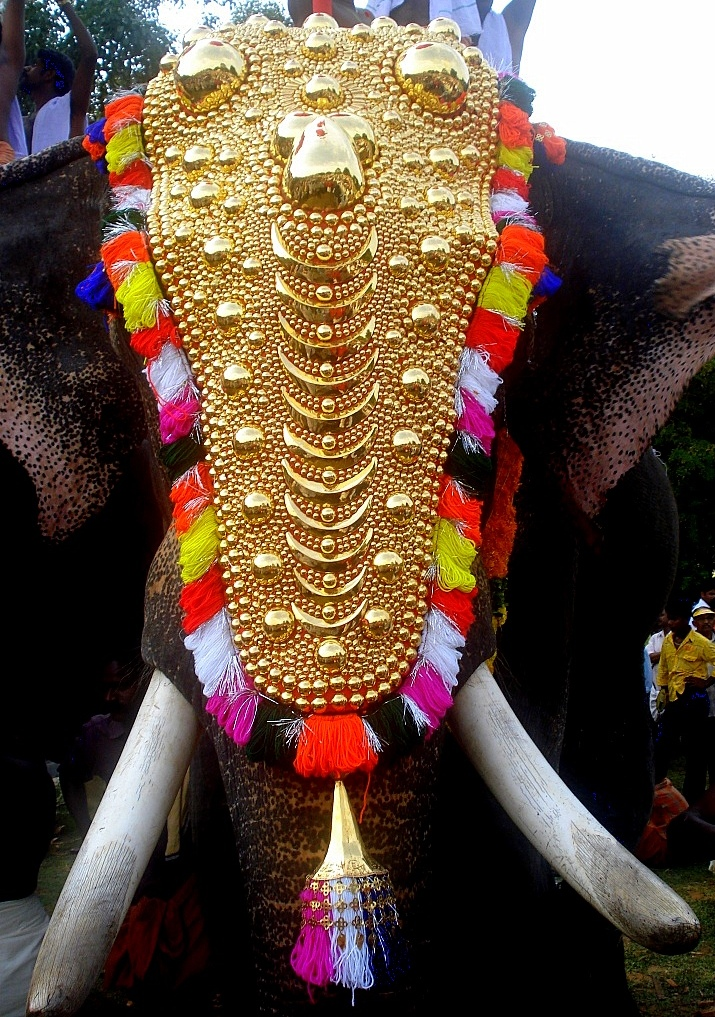

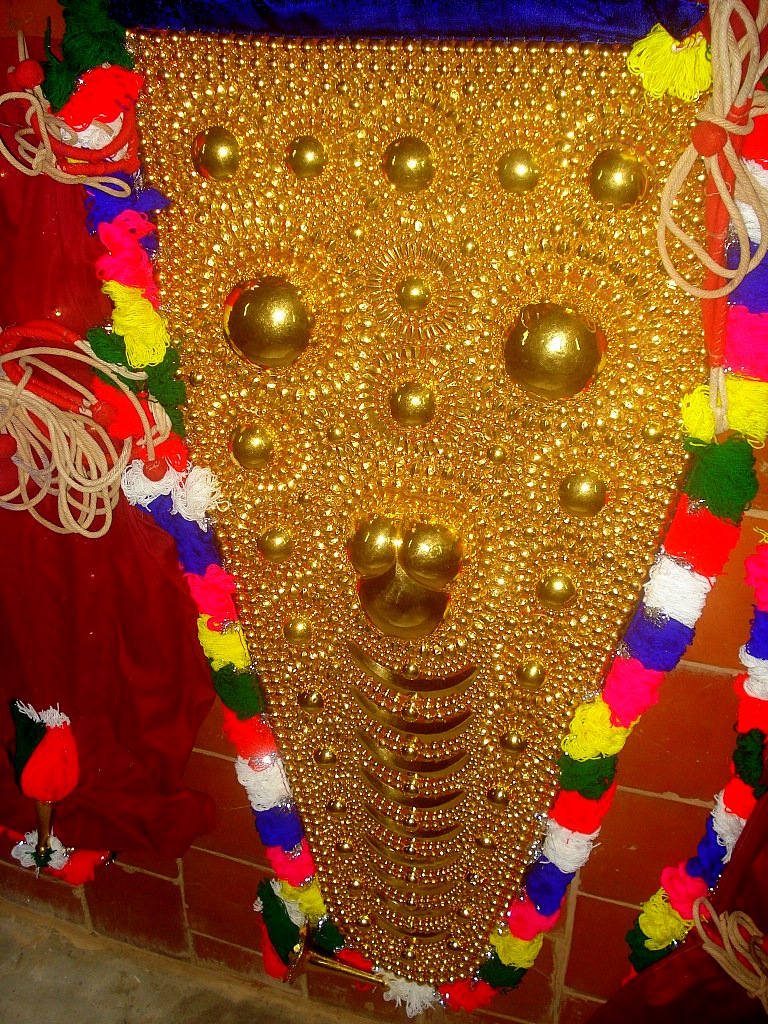
Nettipattom made out of Gold

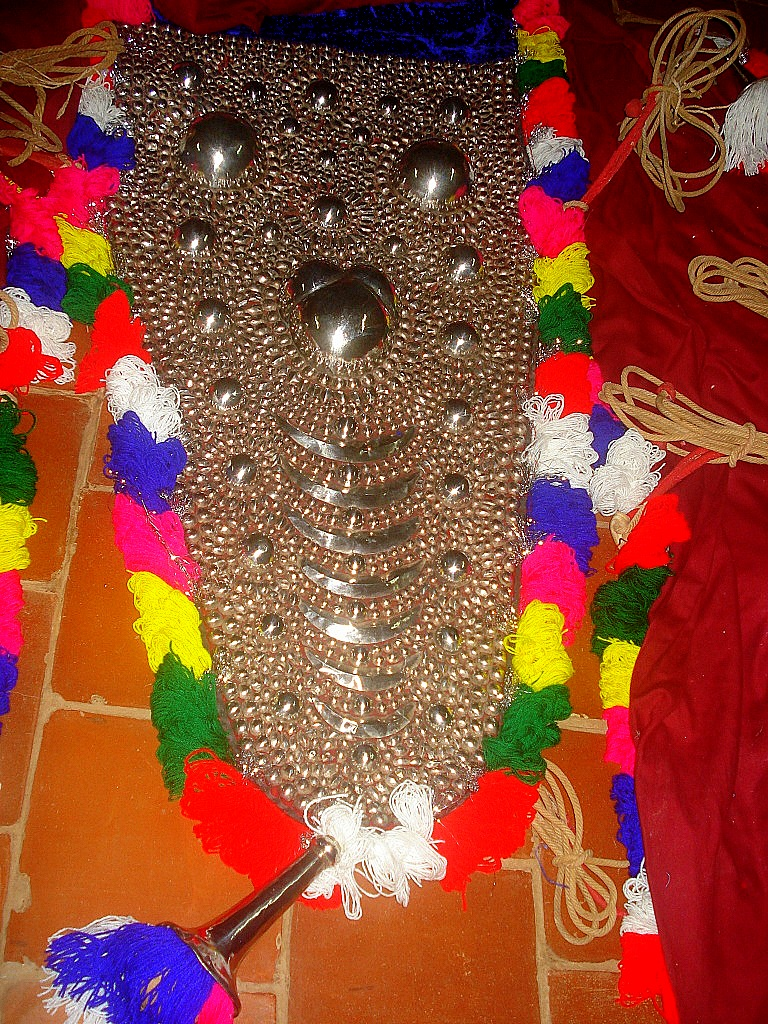
Nettipattom made in Silver

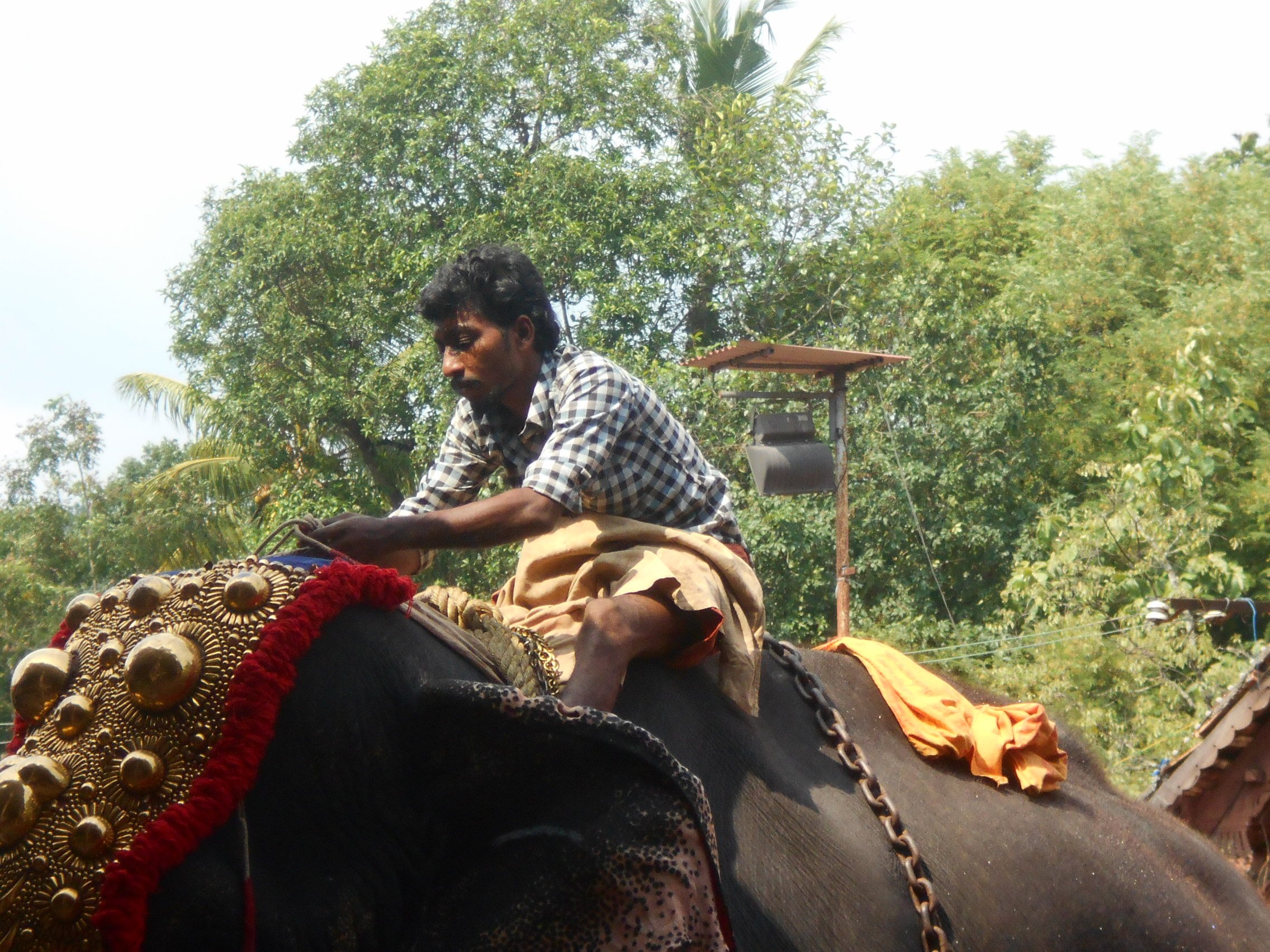
Mahout helping an elephant wear Nettipattom

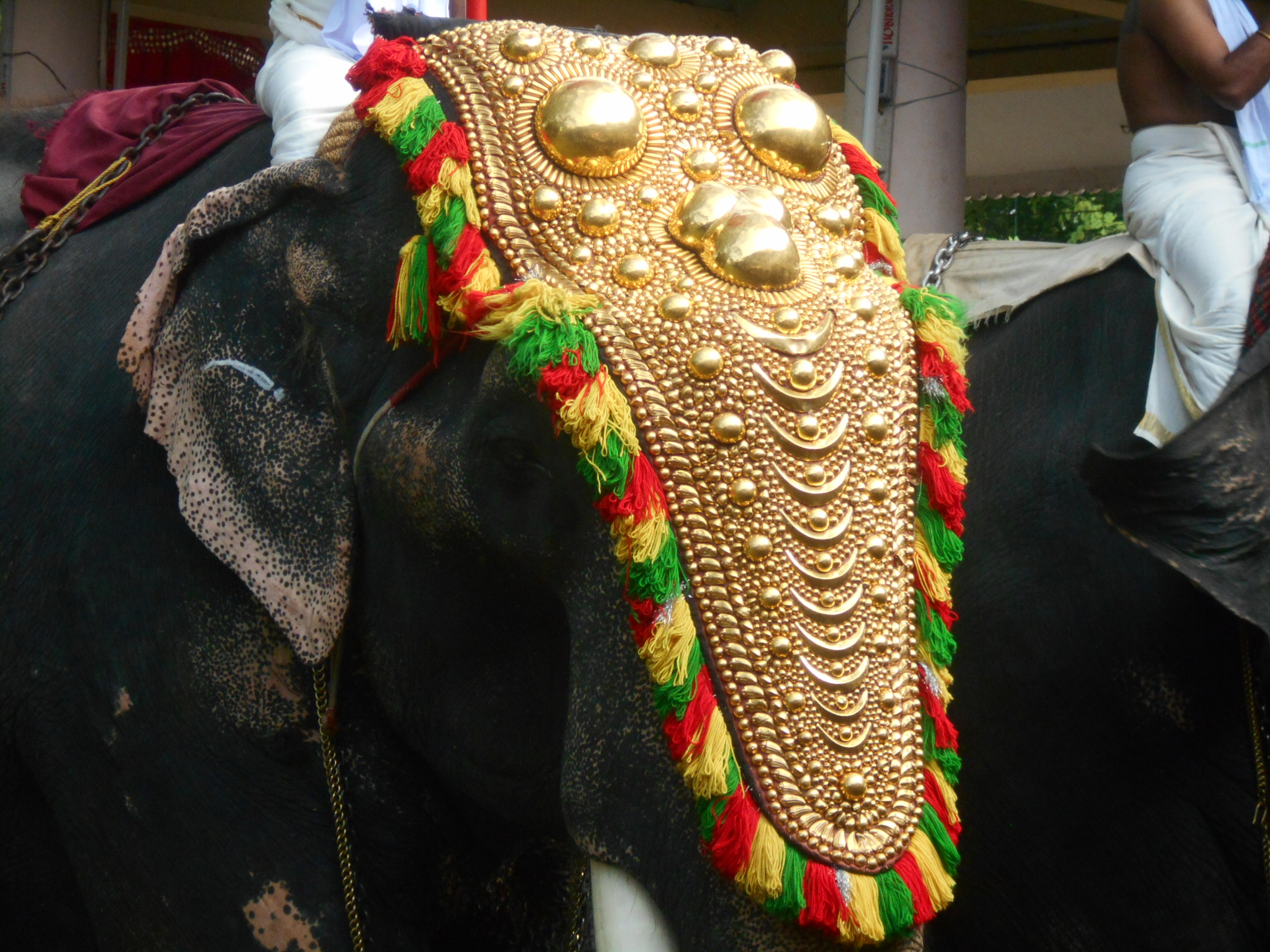

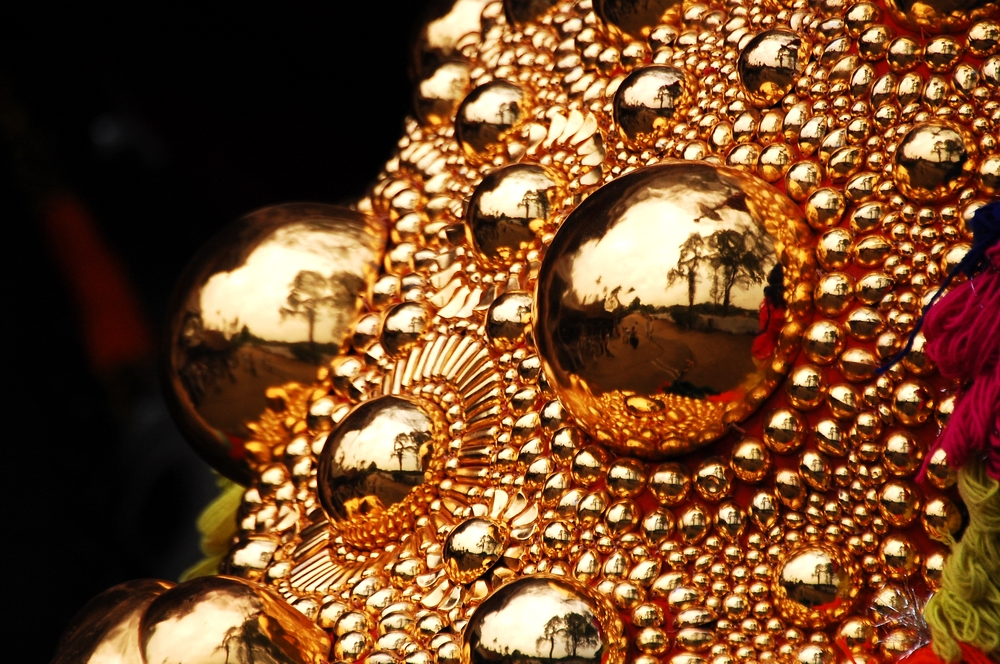
Vannakkinnam

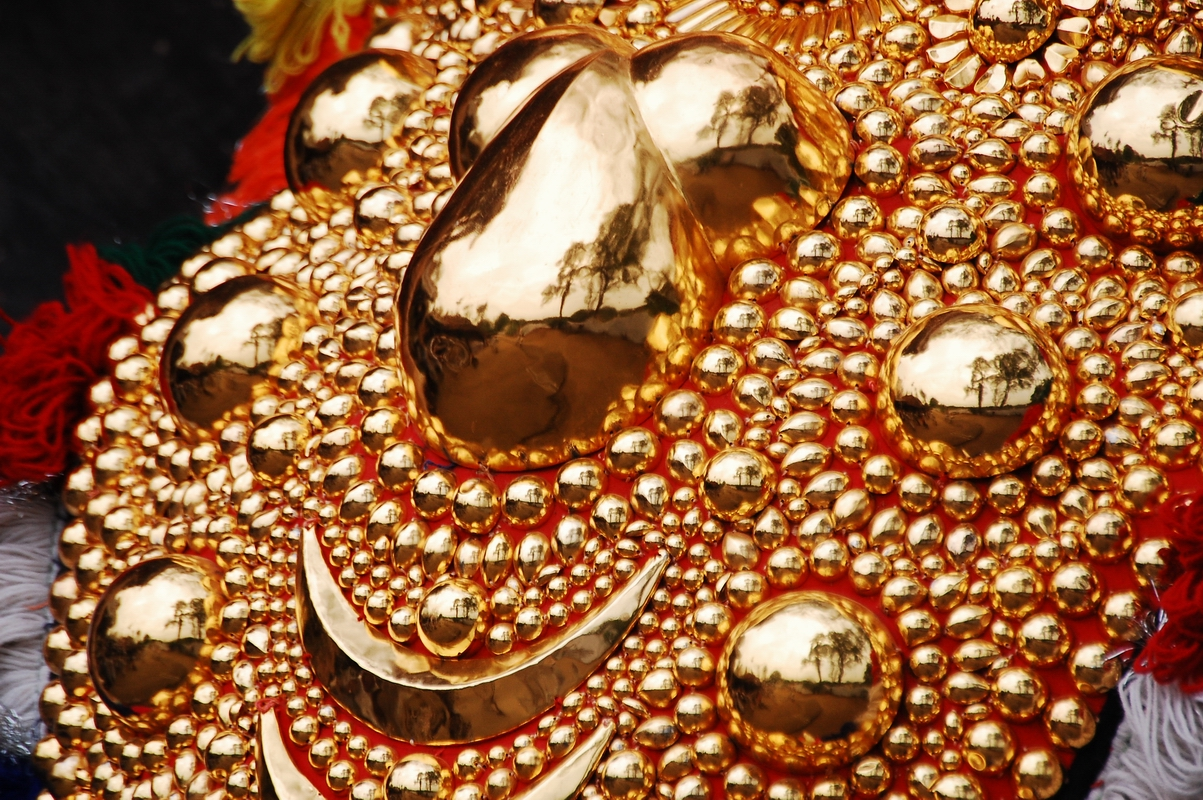
Koomban kinnam
