= Kuthiyottam =

Hindu ritual dance in Kerala, India

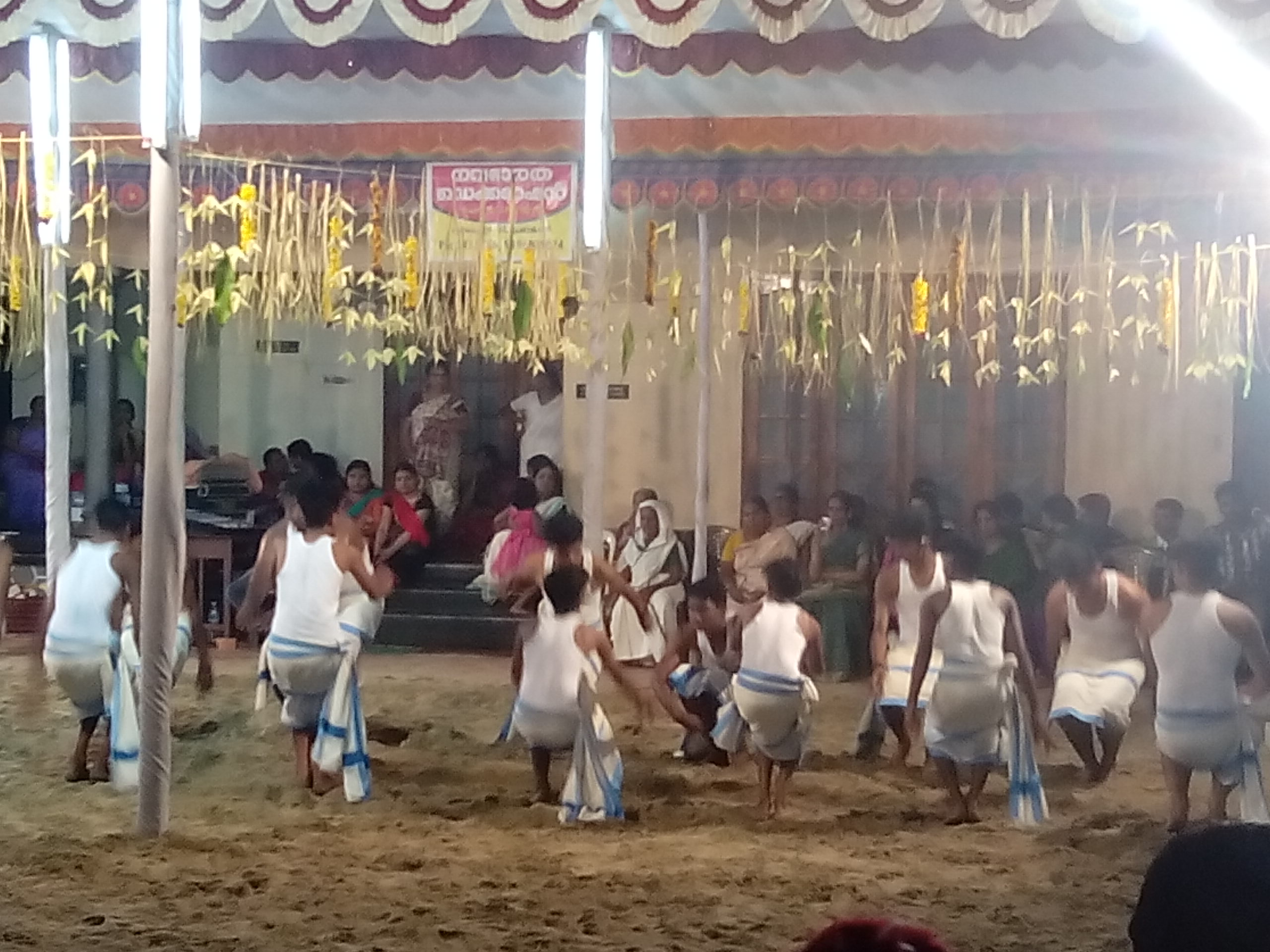
Kuthiyottam

Kuthiyottam, sometimes spelled Kutiyottam, is a ritual youth dance, and in some cases of mock blood sacrifice, found at annual Pongala festival celebrations at some Hindu temples in Kerala dedicated to Bhadrakali or Durga – a warrior goddess. This ritual features volunteer teenage or younger boys who live under austere conditions over the festival period in the Malayalam calendar month of Kumbham. They wear ascetic clothes, abstain from meat and eat simple food, participate in daily prayers in the temple. They also dress up in ceremonial clothes and perform as singers and dancers under the guidance of an asan (conductor). These dances are synchronized with the legends of the goddess. These dances are highly energetic, paced to the beat of drums, with singers and feature traditional costumes.

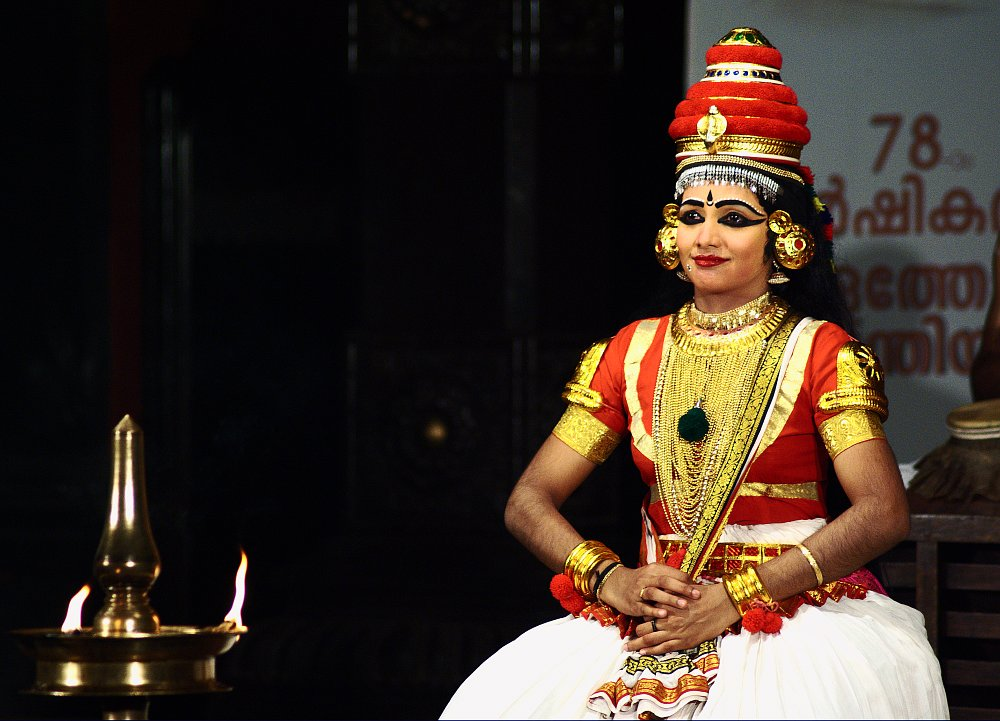
Kuthiyottam is a folk temple art related to the stage form of Kutiyattam

In some Kuthiyottam dances and processions, such as at the Bhadrakali temples of Alappuzha, Kollam, and Thiruvananthapuram districts of Kerala, the dance make up for the boys includes either symbolic blood or real blood from the piercing of their skin. The link with blood is believed by the kuthiyotta troupes to symbolize the wounded soldiers of the goddess. Some scholars have speculated such kuthiyottam practices as having roots in "mock human sacrifice" practices of ancient Kerala. The piercing and blood-related rituals are controversial within Kerala, with officials demanding that they be banned under India's prevention of child abuse laws.

== See also ==
- Rifaʽi Ratib (known as Kuthu Ratheeb in Sri Lanka) - A Muslim body-cutting ritual
- Flagellant – a Christian tradition of self-mortification
- Muharram – a Shia Muslim tradition of mourning processions with flagellation, body-cutting
- Thaipusam – Tamil festival tradition dedicated to Murugan with processions, body-piercing
