= Places of worship in Mavelikkara =

== Temples ==
- Chettikulangara Devi Temple, founded in AD 823, is a Bhagawathy Temple. The major festival is Kumbha Bharani.
- Onampalil Devi Temple Ponnezha, is a Bhagawathy Temple.CHOONATTU KUDUMBAM.
- Kannamangalam south mahadevar temple.
- Kandiyoor Sree Mahadeva Temple, also known as Dakshina Kashi, is the oldest historical evidence of the rich heritage of Mavelikkara. The Kandiyoor Temple is one of 108 temples dedicated to Shiva. Saint Mrikandu, the father and guru of Markandeya, got an idol of Kiratha Moorthy, while taking a bath in the Ganges. He heard a divine voice telling him to put the idol in a holy place. Mrikandu travelled far and finally reached Kandiyoor, whose name derives from "Kandathil Nalla Ooru" meaning "the best place ever seen". Thus, the temple was established and renamed Kandiyoor.
- Sree Krishna Swami Temple is managed and owned by the Travancore Devaswom board. The main festival is held during Meenam. The Statue of Buddha at the Buddha junction in front of the temple has been recovered from the Achankovil River.
- Puthiyacavu Devi Temple is managed and owned by NSS.
- Velathandethu kaavu, Pallarimangalam
- Perkattu Sree Dharma Sastha Temple, Puthiyacavu.
- Malimel Bhagavathi Temple: located in Kurathikad, owned by Nadalayil family trust. Main festival is the 'Revathi Thirunal' festival in Meenam (Malayalam) month. The Sapthaha Yanjam and Anpoli vazhipadu by youngsters of the village are the main attractions during the festival time. Devotees believing that one of the upadevatha calling "Ammumma" giving protection during pregnancy period & delivery time if the pregnant woman keeping one stone from the Ammumma's temple. Pregnant ladies from other areas also coming & following the custom.
- Chunakara Thiruvairoor Mahadevar Temple is the oldest historical temple located in Chunakara, which is 11 km from Mavelikkara. Its festival season is in January and February.
- Vettiyar Palliyarakavu Temple, Vettiyar.
- Velathandethu Kaavu, Pallarimangalam
- Padanilam Parabrahma Temple, Nooranad
- Shree Parabhramodya Temple, Varenickal. There is no building structure for the Shreekovil as the God has forbidden any construction at the site. The festival at the temple held during the December–January Mandala season.
- Shree Saraswati Temple is situated at Thattarambalam dedicated to Saraswati Devi. Recent donations have led to better developments of the temple structure. Its main festival is held during the Navarathri Festival period dedicated to Durga Devi.
- Ponnaramthottam Devi Temple, located near Power House and District Court.This is ancient temple and a rare temple in India Durga and Bhadra is the main prathista. Main festival is on Patham Udayam. Devotees believes in pongala festival on Vishu day for achieving goals. Only this temple in kerala supply Ayurvedic Medical "awshadha kanji"on Karkidakam season after Deepa araadhana. Every January Ponnaramthottam temple celebrate "Navaham" (9 days pooja) and Anna Danam is Famous for arrangements and neatness.
- Dhanwanthari Temple, Prayikkara.
- Subramanya Swamy Temple, Thazhakkara.
- Ganapathy Temple, Aalthara, Padinjare Nada.
- Sree Durga Devi Temple, Karazhma.
- Ulachikkadu Sree Mahavishnu Temple, Karazhma.
- Mannoor Madhom Siva Temple.
- Mattom Narasimha Swamy Temple is situated in the north of Thattarambalam. It is one of the oldest temple in Mavelikara,, situated near Achankovil river. The festival of the temple takes place during Vrichikam (November–December).
- Mannalil Temple is situated to the south of Aranoottimangalam. The festival day is Makaram 28, known as "Irupathettam Ucharam".
- Tharamel Devi Kshethram is another Bhagavathi temple situated in the central part of Aranoottimangalam. This temple originally belonged to the Kalaykkattu Family, but has been handed over to the NSS Karayogam No.66 by the family's heads, Nalayyathu Chellappan Nair and Thattarethu Damodara Panicker. It is now owned and managed by the NSS Karayogam, No.66, and renovation work has just been completed.
- Ammancheril Devi Kshethram is also in Aranoottimangalam.
- Eravankara Malamutam Mahadeva Temple, Eravankara.
- Eravankara Anandeshwarathu Mahadeva Temple, Eravankara.
- Kattuvallil Shree Dharma Shastha Temple
- Peringra Maha Ganapati Temple, Pela.
- Mullikulangara Temple is a Bhagawathy Temple, situated near Thekkekkara Panchayath. The festival of the temple takes place during Meenam. Mullikulangara Bhagawathy and Chettikulangara Bhagawathy are considered as Sisters.
- Umbernadu Shree Dharma Shastha Temple.
- Umbernadu "Chettiyarezhath Bhadrakali Ancient Temple".
- Vathikulangara Devi temple. Mavelikara
- Veerad Vishwakarma Temple, Kurathikadu, Mavelikkara
- Vadakkodukkathu Shiva Temple, Umbernadu, Mavelikara
- Vadakke Mankuzhi Sri Bhadrakali Temple (Puthanambalam), situated in Thadathilal on the way from Mavelikara to Kurathikad. It is now owned and managed by the NSS Karayogam. The main festival is held in Kumbham on Revathi every year. Sapthaham and Pongala is offered by the villagers every year.
- Kandiyoor Devi Kshetram, Kandiyoor, Mavelikara
- Keerthipuram Sreekrishna Swamy Temple, near Kandiyoor Aarattukadavu
- Maruthakshi Devi Temple, Near Railway Station, Mavelikara. Kumbham Aswathy is the day for annual Aswathy festival, just a day before Kumbha Bharani at Chettikulangara. The festival forms the cultural fabric of Mavelikara with colorful processions
- Velathandethu Kaavu, Pallarimangalam, Thekkekara. Mavelikara.

== Churches ==
- St.Joseph's Roman Catholic Church, Established in 1920s, One of the Roman Catholic Church located in the heart of Mavelikara Town belongs to Kollam Diocese, which is in the Nangiarkulangara-Pandalam SH, near to Mavelikara Municipal Park.
- St Mary's Orthodox Cathedral, founded in 943 AD, also known as 'Puthiyakavu Pally', is one of the oldest churches in central Travancore. In 1836, delegates of Malankara Church gathered here to decide on severing ties with the British Anglican missionaries. This historic meeting is known as 'Mavelikara Padiyola'.
- St Mary's Roman Catholic Church, at Cherukole, founded in 1965. Cherukole was given the status of a parish in 1976. St Mary's society, founded in 1946, plays an important role in the socio-economic development of the parishioners. A new church was completed in 2007. The mission of the Parish is to bring up the prisoners spiritually and materially. The parish is located in the bank of Achen Kovil River, in Mavelikara Taluk. Pastoral priorities of the community are education and spiritual growth. The feast of the Immaculate Conception of the Holy Virgin Mary is celebrated on 8 December every year.

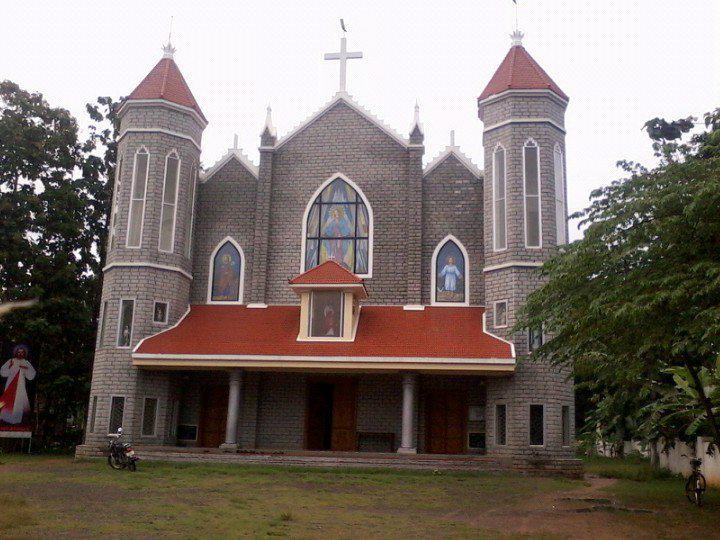
St Mary's Roman Catholic Church at Cherukole

- C.S.I. Christ Church is the oldest Protestant church in Mavelikara built by CMS missionary Reverend Joseph Peet and dedicated in 1839. and rededicated on 3 April 1850.

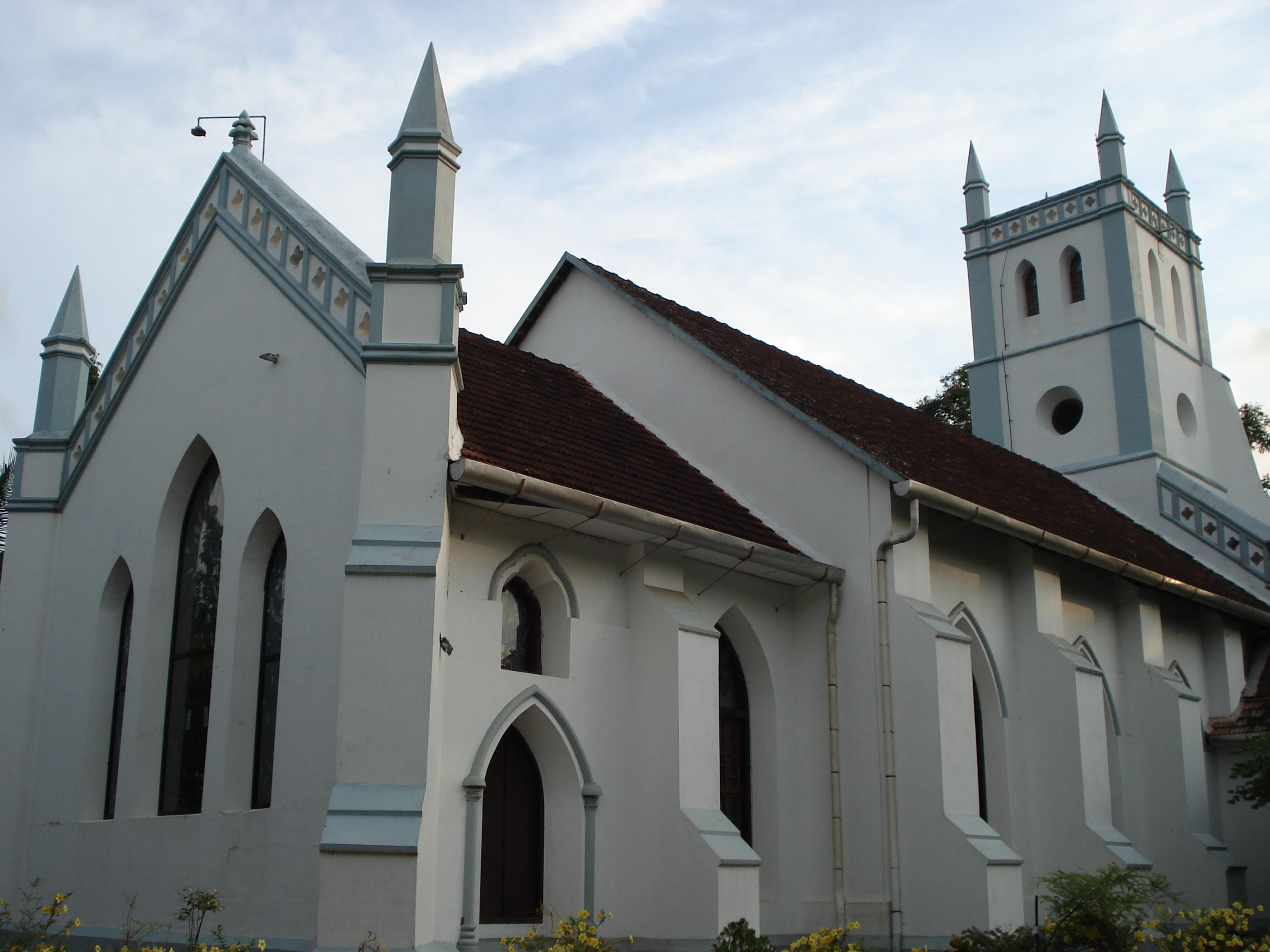
C.S.I. Christ Church

- C.S.I. Ascension Church, Cherukunnam is 150 years old. It belongs to the Central Kerala Diocese of Church of South India. It has 88 families and about 500 members.
- Marthoma Church Thazhakara marthoma church is one of the oldest marthoma churches in Mavelikara. The Diocese has a nursery, parish hall, shop building, parsonage, Polachirackal Colony and Jyothis school.
- St Thomas Marthoma Church Kallimel, at Eravankara,
- St Kuriakose Orthodox Church at Arnoottimangalam is a church dedicated to the lesser known Saint, St Kuriakose.
- St Paul Church, Kallumala
- Church of God in India, a Pentecostal church at Erezha South, Chettikulangara.
- Mar Baselios .Church commonly known as "Vazhuvady Pally".
- St Mary's Syro-Malankara Catholic Cathedral is a diocese of the Major Archiepiscopal Eparchy of Trivandrum. with 94 parishes and 37,000 worshipers.
- Praise City Church (later renamed Praise City Revival Church) was established in 1982 near Fire Station Mavelikara.
- Carmel Assemblies of God Church, Pallikkal East, Kurathikad, Mavelikkara (Phone:9633335211)was established in the 1960s. It was the first Pentecostal Church in Kurathikad, Mavelikkara.Initially it was affiliated with Pentecostal Church of God Thazhakkara. (Founded by Pastor P.J Daniel son or Pastor A.J John was one of the pioneers of Assemblies of God in Kerala.) In the 1990s the congregation joined the Assemblies of God movement following the initiatives of Rev. Dr. P.S. Philip, the superintendent of AGMDC and local church members such as Brother K.M. Jacob Kalloormangalam, Pastor C.D. George Sathyabhavanam and Pastor K.A. Andrews Kankalil. Pastor Royson Johni serve there from 2018 May onwards.
- Indian Pentecostal Church of God - IPC Kannamangalam, Chettikulangara.
- Assemblies of God Bethel Hall, established in 1924.
- St Sebastian Roman Catholic Church, Valiyaperumpuzha, Thattarampalam
- St Thomas Evangelical Church of India, Thazhakara is 50 years old.
- St Pauls Marthoma Church Vathikulam, Olakettiambalam
- St Gregorios Orthodox Church was consecrated in 1945 at Punnammodu.
- Velathandethu kaavu. Above 300yrs old at Pallarimangalam.
- Padanilathu Temple. At Pallarimangalam.
