= Abraham Ephiphanios =

Indian bishop (born 1960)

- Church: Malankara Orthodox Syrian Church
- Diocese: Mavelikara Orthodox Diocese
- In office: 2009 – Present

Orders
- Ordination: 19 Feb 2009

Personal details
- Born: 17 September 1960 (age 64); Kozhenchery

Abraham Epiphanios as of 2020 is the metropolitan of the Mavelikara Diocese of Malankara Orthodox Syrian Church. He was previously the metropolitan of Sulthan Bathery diocese and the assistant metropolitan of Bangalore Diocese. He was born on 17 September 1960 in Kozhenchery. He is a member of St. Mary's Cathedral, Malaysia.

Ephiphanios had his education in Pathanamthitta Catholicate College, the Orthodox Theological Seminary and took M.Th. degree from Serampore University. He was ordained as deacon in 1986 and priest in 1987 respectively; on 31 March 2002, he became Ramban. He was in the ashrams in Parumala and Madras from 1990 to 1996. He also served as Vicar of St. Thomas Cathedral from 1996 to 2002.

Thereafter, he served as the Manager of Bishop's House, Madras in 2003. From 2004 to 2006, he was the Manager at Parumala Seminary and from 2007 he served as the Manager of Devalokam Catholicate Aramana.
