= Sreekantapuram hospital =

Hospital in Kerala, India

Sreekantapuram Hospital is a 250-bed multi-specialty hospital in Mavelikara, a municipal town in Alappuzha district of Kerala, India. It was established in 1947 by G.S. Thampi. The small clinic was later expanded into a multi specialty hospital by his son S. Sreekantan.

== Departments ==
Sreekantapuram Hospital has the following departments :

- General Medicine; General Surgery; Obstetrics & Gynaecology; Pediatrics; Cardiology; Orthopaedics;

Neurology; Urology; Dermatology; Otorhinolaryngology; Ophthalmology; Psychiatry; Physiotherapy; Anesthesiology; Pain and Palliative care; Imageology

== Facilities ==
Sreekantapuram Hospital provides the following facilities:

- Accident and Trauma Care
- Laproscopic Surgery
- Echocardiogram & TMT
- ICU and Neonatal ICU
- Whole Body CT Scan
- Fully Computerised Laboratory and Pharmacy
- X Ray
- Colour Doppler and Ultrasound Scanning

Sreekantapuram Hospital also has a Nursing School attached to it with an annual intake of 30 students. The institute is recognized by the Indian Nursing Council.

Sreekantapuram Hospital has BSNL (Bharat Sangar Nigam Ltd), FCI (Food Corporation of India), Ex-servicemen Contributory Health Scheme (ECHS), etc. as its corporate clients and is affiliated with all the major insurance companies.
