= Mavelikara Orthodox Diocese =

Diocese of the Malankara Orthodox Syrian Church in India

Diocese of Mavelikara

Orthodox
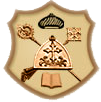
- Catholicate Emblem

Location
- Country: India
- Territory: Mavelikara
- Metropolitan: H. G. Abraham Mar Ephiphanios
- Headquarters: TheobhavanAramana, Thazhakkara P.O, Mavelikkara- 690 102

Information
- First holder: Kolathukalathil Paulose Mar Pachomios
- Rite: Malankara Rite
- Established: 10 August 2002
- Diocese: Mavelikara Diocese
- Parent church: Malankara Orthodox Syrian Church

Website
- Mavelikara Diocese

Mavelikkara Diocese is one of the 32 dioceses of the Malankara Orthodox Syrian Church. The diocese was created on 10 August 2002. H.G Vattamparambil Dr Abraham Mar Epiphanios, is the Metropolitan of the diocese. The head office is located in TheoBhavan Aramana, Thazhakkara, Mavelikkara.

== History ==
This diocese was founded on 10 August 2002. It was inaugurated in the presence of Baselios Mar Thoma Mathews II, former Catholicos of the East. Kolathukalathil Paulose Pachomios was the first Metropolitan. Forty parishes and twelve chapels of the dioceses of Kollam, Niranam and Chengannoor, and the erstwhile 39 parishes here were annexed to the newly introduced one. The headquarters of the diocese was consecrated by Baselios Mar Thoma Didymos I in 2008. On 1 August 2012, Mar Pachomios died and Baselios Mar Thoma Paulose II, the then-Malankara Metropolitan, became the metropolitan and appointed Sankarathil Joshua Mar Nicodimos as the assistant metropolitan. In 2017, Alexios Eusebios was appointed the assistant metropolitan. In 2021, Baselios Marthoma Paulose II died and Baselios Marthoma Mathews III became the metropolitan.

== Now ==
The diocese is reigned by the Malankara Metropolitan Baselios Marthoma Mathews III. Dr Abraham Mar Epiphanios is the current Assistant Metropolitan of the Diocese. There are 41 churches and nine chapels with fifty priests in diocese.

Paulose Mar Pachomios Shalem Bhavan, which cares for 60 men with mental health issues, is located in Arunoottimangalam and run by the diocese. Cheppad Mar Dionysious Old Age Home situated at Cheppad and St Thomas Balabhavan at Haripad are other charitable institutions under the diocese.

== Parishes ==
- Arunootimangalam St. Kuriakose Orthodox Church
- Anari St. John's Orthodox Church
- Cheppad St. George Orthodox Valiyapali
- Cheppad St. George Orthodox Cheriyapali
- Chunakkara Mar Baselios Gregorios Orthodox Church
- Chunakkara North St. George Orthodox Church
- Danapady St. George Orthodox Church
- Ennackad St. Mary's Orthodox Church
- Evoor St. Mary's Orthodox Church
- Haripad St. Mary's Orthodox Church
- Karuvatta Mar Yacob Burdana Orthodox Church
- Karuvatta North St. George Orthodox Church
- Karipuzha St. George Orthodox Church
- Karmulackal St. Gregorios Orthodox Church
- Kannanakuzhy St. George
- Kattanam St. Stephens Orthodox Valiyapali
- Kattachira St. Mary's Orthodox pilgrim Church
- Kallimel Kaluvayayam St. Thomas Orthodox Church
- Kayamkulam Kadeesha Orthodox Cathedral
- Karazhma St.Mary's Orthodox Church
- Karichal St. George Orthodox Church
- Karthikapally St. Thomas Orthodox Cathedral
- Kottampally Mar Elijah Orthodox Church
- Koipally Karanma St. Mary's Orthodox Church
- Kunnam St. George Orthodox Church
- Kutamperror St. Gregorios Orthodox Church
- Kutamperror Zionpuram St. Thomas Orthodox Church
- Mankuzhy South St. George Orthodox Church
- Mavalikera Puthiyacavu St. Mary's Orthodox Cathedral
- Mathirampally Mar Gregorios Orthodox Church
- Mutton St. Mary's Orthodox Church
- Muthukulam St. George Orthodox Church
- Pathachira St. Johns Orthodox Valiyapali
- Pathiyoor St. George Orthodox Church
- Pallipad St. George Catholicate Simhasana Church
- Perengelipuram St. George Orthodox Church
- Punammoodu Mar Gregorios Orthodox Church
- Thonackad St. George Orthodox Church
- Vallikunnam St. George Orthodox Church
- Vazhuvady Mar Baselios Orthodox Church
- Vettiyar St.Mary's Orthodox Church

== Diocesan Metropolitans ==
Mavelikara Orthodox Diocesan Metropolitan
From	Until	Metropolitan	Notes
2002	2012	Kolathukalathil Paulose Mar Pachomios	1st Metropolitan of the diocese
2012	12-Jul-2021	Baselios Marthoma Paulose II Catholicos	2nd Metropolitan of the diocese, Ruled as Malankara Metropolitan
15-Oct-2021	03-Nov-2022	Baselios Marthoma Mathews III Catholicos	3rd Metropolitan of the diocese
03-Nov-2022	Incumbent	Abraham Mar Ephiphanios	4th Metropolitan of the diocese

Assistant Metropolitan
From	Until	Metropolitan	Notes
10-Dec-2012	20-Sep-2017	Joshua Mar Nicodimos	Assistant metropolitan
20-Sep-2017	03 Nov 2022	Alexios Mar Eusebius	Assistant metropolitan
