= Valiyaperumpuzha =

Coordinates: 9.26334°N 76.51893°E

- Village
- Interactive map of Valiyaperumpuzha
- Country: India
- State: Kerala
- District: Alappuzha

Languages
  - Official: Malayalam, English
- Time zone: UTC+5:30 (IST)
- Vehicle registration: KL-31
- Lok Sabha constituency: Mavelikara

Valiyaperumpuzha is a village situated in Mavelikkara, on the banks of the Achankovil river, in between Mavelikkara Municipality, Chennithala Panchayat, and Chettikulangara Panchayat in Kerala, India. Valiyaperumpuzha is situated 2 kilometres (1.2 mi) north of Thattarambalanm Junction.

St Sebastian's Roman Catholic Church is situated at Valiyaperumpuzha which comes under the Mavelikkara Forane in Roman Catholic Diocese of Quilon. The Chennithala Palliyodam (snake boat) is another attraction; in September 2022, a palliyodam overturned and three passengers drowned.

== See also ==
Nearby places and cities
