= A. V. Vasudevan Potti =

Indian lyricist

A. V. Vasudevan Potti (25 October 1951 - 19 November 2024) was an Indian poet and lyricist who worked in Malayalam film industry and Hindu devotional song industry.

== Life ==
Potti was born in Mavelikkara, Alappuzha district, Kerala, India, as the son of A. N. Vasudevan Potti (Athimon Illam) and Devaki Antharjanam (Mannarassala Illam). He began to write poems in various magazines at age 19.

== Career ==
Potti's first album was Mannarassala Nagasthuthikal, released in 1989. He was featured in Thathwamasi, a collection of songs about Ayyappan. He got his first break as a Hindu devotional lyricist on the album Devigeetham, released by Magnasound in 1993.

In 1995 Potti entered the Malayalam film industry with a song for Kakkakkum Poochakkum Kalyanam, directed by Raveendran Maash. Potti also wrote songs for Kannum Khadarum Kannamangalathu, Aala, and others. Potti, who retired as a chief ticket examiner in Indian Railways, lived in Palakkad, along with his wife Nirmala Devi, with whom he has two sons. He died due to a massive heart attack on 19 November 2024, aged 73. His dead body was taken to his ancestral home in Mavelikkara, and was cremated there.

== Works ==
- Mannarassala Naagasthuthikal
- Thathwamasi
- Devigeetham Volume 1
- Devigeetham Volume 2
- Devigeetham Volume 3
