= Padanilam Parabrahma Temple =

Nooranad Padanilam Parabrahma Temple
- പടനിലം പരബ്രഹ്മ ക്ഷേത്രം
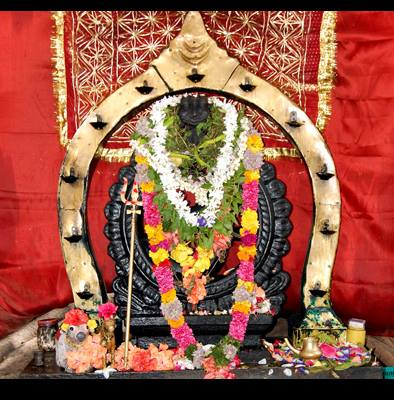

- Parabrahma Temple, Padanilam, Alappuzha, Kerala

Religion
- Affiliation: Hinduism
- District: Alappuzha
- Deity: Parabrahma
- Festivals: Mahashivarathri; Vrischika mahotsavam Irupathiyettamonam; Mandala chirappu Para ezhunnallath

Location
- Location: Padanilam, Nooranad
- State: Kerala
- Country: India
- Interactive map of Nooranad Padanilam Parabrahma Temple
- Coordinates: 9.1929°N 76.6366°E

Specifications
- Temple: One
- Elevation: 49.83 m (163 ft)

Padanilam Parabrahma Temple (പടനിലം പരബ്രഹ്മ ക്ഷേത്രം ) is situated at Padanilam in Mavelikara taluk of Alappuzha district in Kerala, India. It is one of the major temples in erstwhile Travancore state. Padanilam is the cultural center of Nooranad region. The temple is situated 17 km east of Kayamkulam and 7 km south west of Pandalam. The temple is dedicated to Lord Parabrahma, also known as omkaram.

== History ==
Padanilam Temple is believed to be swayambhu. Its actual history and the facts about how worship started there are unknown. Padanilam has been the administrative centre of Nooranad and it has the history of intense conflict between various karakal (territories) around the temple. This was for gaining control over the temple administration and thereby controlling the entire village. Due to this pada (battle/conflict), the place is said to have got its name. It is believed that the army troops of Kayamkulam Kingdom was camped near the temple for protecting the kingdom from the attack of neighbouring kings. During this period, the village had some chieftains and their supporters. They include Noorukodi Unnithans, Kadackal Kuruppans, Vettathasaans and Vettadickal Kuruppans.

Kayamkulam Raja withdrew his troops about four centuries ago. This initiated tensions between the chieftains for control of the village. Thus they divided into south and north, starting battle. The south side consisted of Noorukodi Karuppans and Kadackal Kuruppans. The other side had Vettathasans and Vettadickal Kuruppans with them. Twenty-two karakal supported their respective sides. During the battle, many soldiers of both the sides died in large numbers. They were buried in the chira near the temple. Even from very earliest of times, this temple was a blessing for the people in the surrounding areas. It is also believed that the battle was between Marthanda varma King on one side and Kayamkulam King on the other. The twenty-two karakals of Nooranad took side with the two kings. The common people started worrying about the devastation of the war and approached the Pazhoor Panamana Thampuran to find a solution to end the war. He tried to intervene but the parties were not in a position to stop. He made a tent in the eastern part of the temple and started fasting unto death. But that also did not deter the warring parties. But when he was on the verge of death due to the fast, they fearing the Brahmanasaapam, agreed to stop war. They demarcated the boundary in the north-south direction and stopped the war in the name of Parabrahma, the presiding deity of the temple.

== Padanilam Sivarathri ==
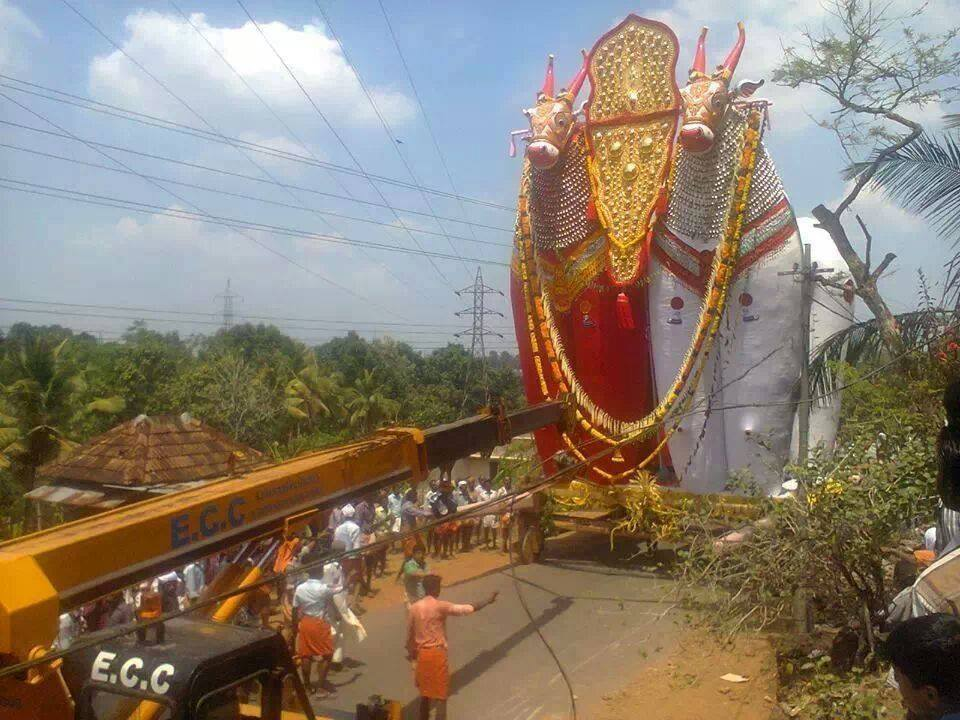
Nandikeshan from Edappon kara

Sivarathri is the main festival in the temple. Giant effigies of bulls, known locally as kettukala, are pulled to the temple from 15 territories (kara) of the temple. Some of these have a height of more than 50 feet. Its one of the largest festivals of its kind in Kerala. There are many people in the Nooranad area, who are involved in the making of these colossal effigies. There is a proposal in front of the Kerala Government to recognize this village as the Nandikesha Paithruka Gramam due to its cultural importance. Thousands come to the temple on Sivarathri day to see the kaavadiyattam for Lord Subrahmanyan in the morning. Kaavady from all parts of the area come separately and meet at the temple. Kettulsavam is the most spectacular sight of the festival and is held in the evening. Kettulsavam from the distinct areas of the village come to the temple at around 4 p.m. The rituals and programmes only end at midnight.

== Temple Specialities ==
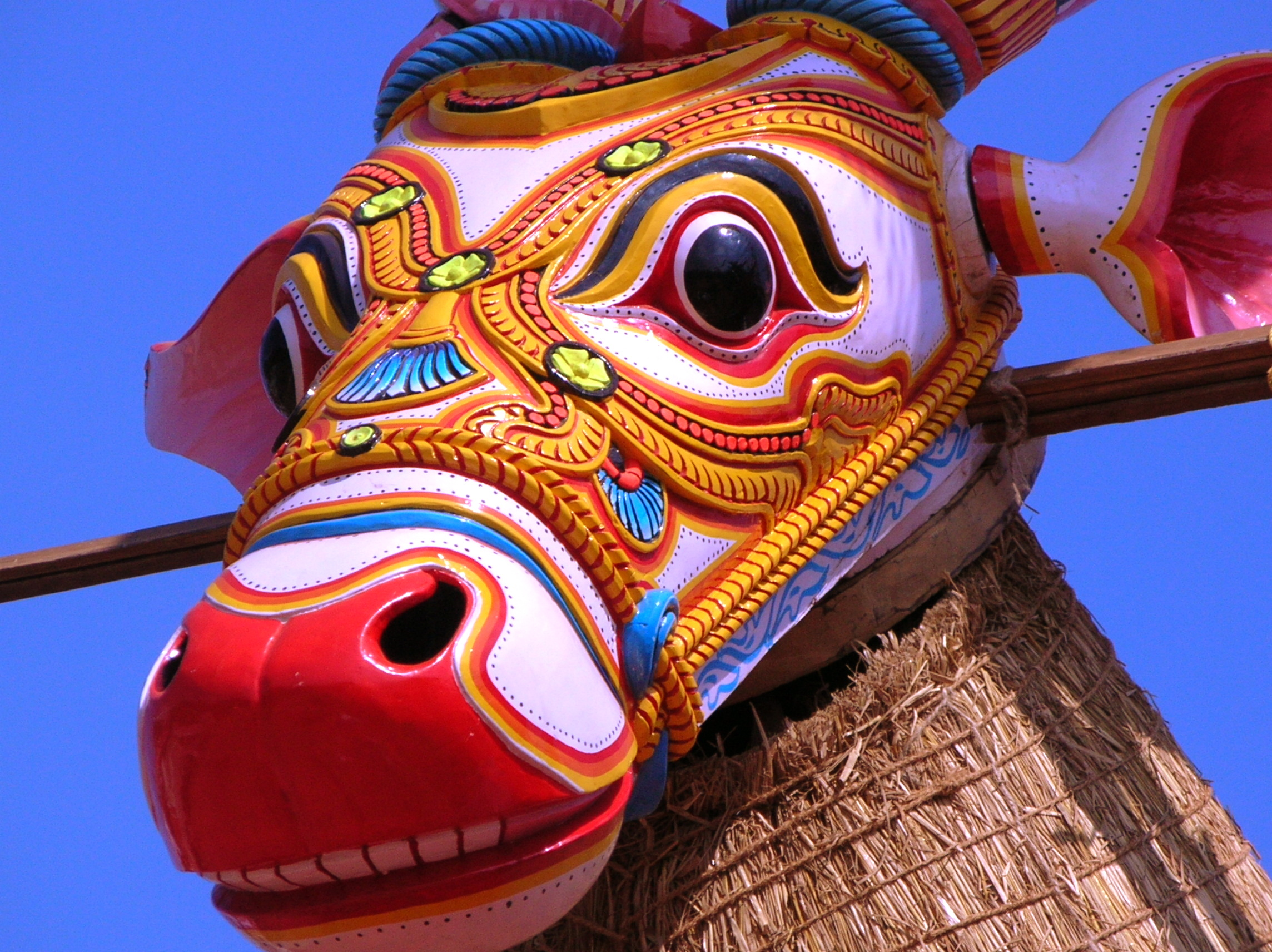
Decorated head of a Kettukala

- The temple has no protective walls or roofs
- The priests are not necessarily Brahmins.
- The temple neither opens nor closes. Rituals like Nada thurappu (opening of the temple in the dawn) and Nada adakkal (closing of the temple during night) are not performed at this temple.
- Non-Hindus are permitted to enter the temple and can even take part in all the celebrations related to temple including Shivarathri kettukazhcha. Religious unity is a trademark of Padanilam and it upholds the real culture of India.
- Vibhuti (holy ash) is given to devotees instead of Sandalwood paste.
- There is no proper idol in the temple. Only a stone image of OM and is placed under natural roof formed by tree leaves.
- Devotees can stay in the temple compound for the first 12 days of the month Vrischikam for doing bhajan for Lord Parabrahman. For this purpose special huts are made in temple premise and devotees lead a holy life these days. The number of huts are increasing year by year.
- The temple is one of the Idathaavalam of Sabarimala Dharma Sastha Temple.The temple provides resting place for Ayyappa devotees coming from various places. Many Pamba special service buses are passing through Padanilam. Temple authority is providing dried ginger coffee and light food for Sabarimala devotees.

== Karakal (territories) ==
Padanilam Parabrahma Temple temple has mainly 15 karakal (territories). They are

- Nedukulanjimuri
- Palamel
- Thathammunna
- Edappon
- Naduvilemuri
- Muthukattukara
- Ulavukkad Kara
- Erumakuzhy
- Puthupallikunnam
- Kudassanad
- Pulimel
- Edakkunnam
- Pattoor
- Pazhanjikkonam
- Kidangayam
- Pallikal-payyanallor
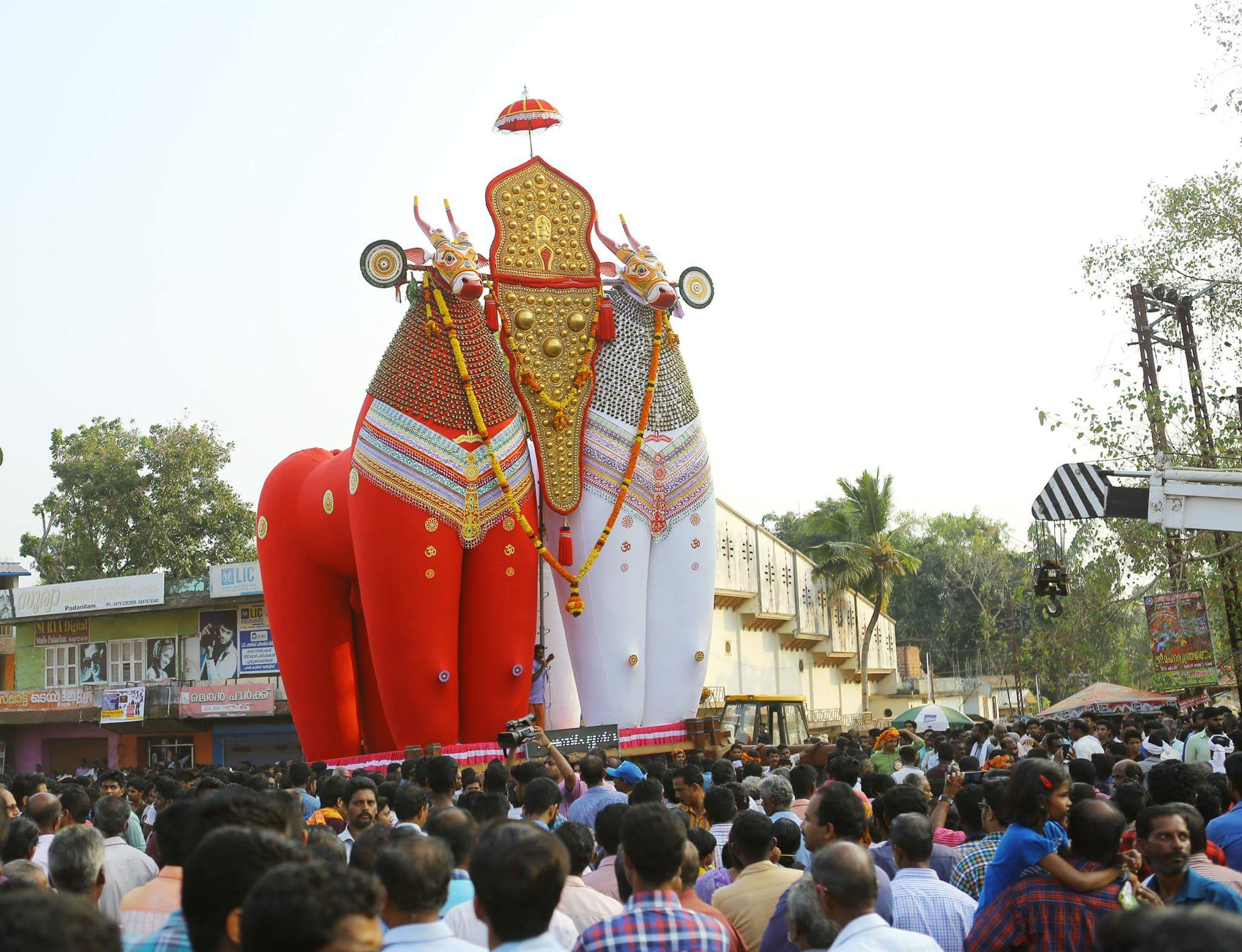
Nandikeshan from Nedukulanji kara

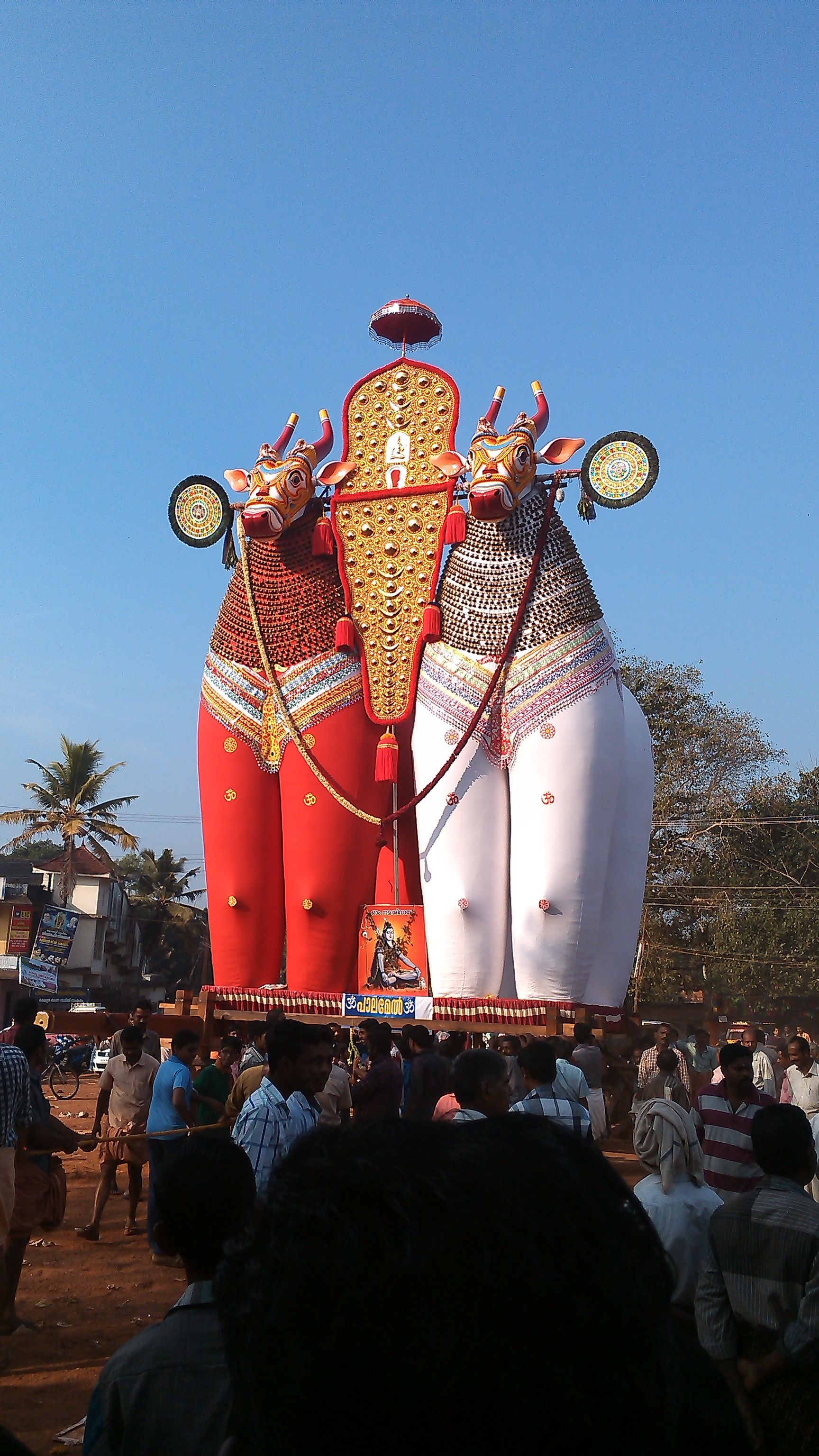
Nandikeshan from Palamel kara

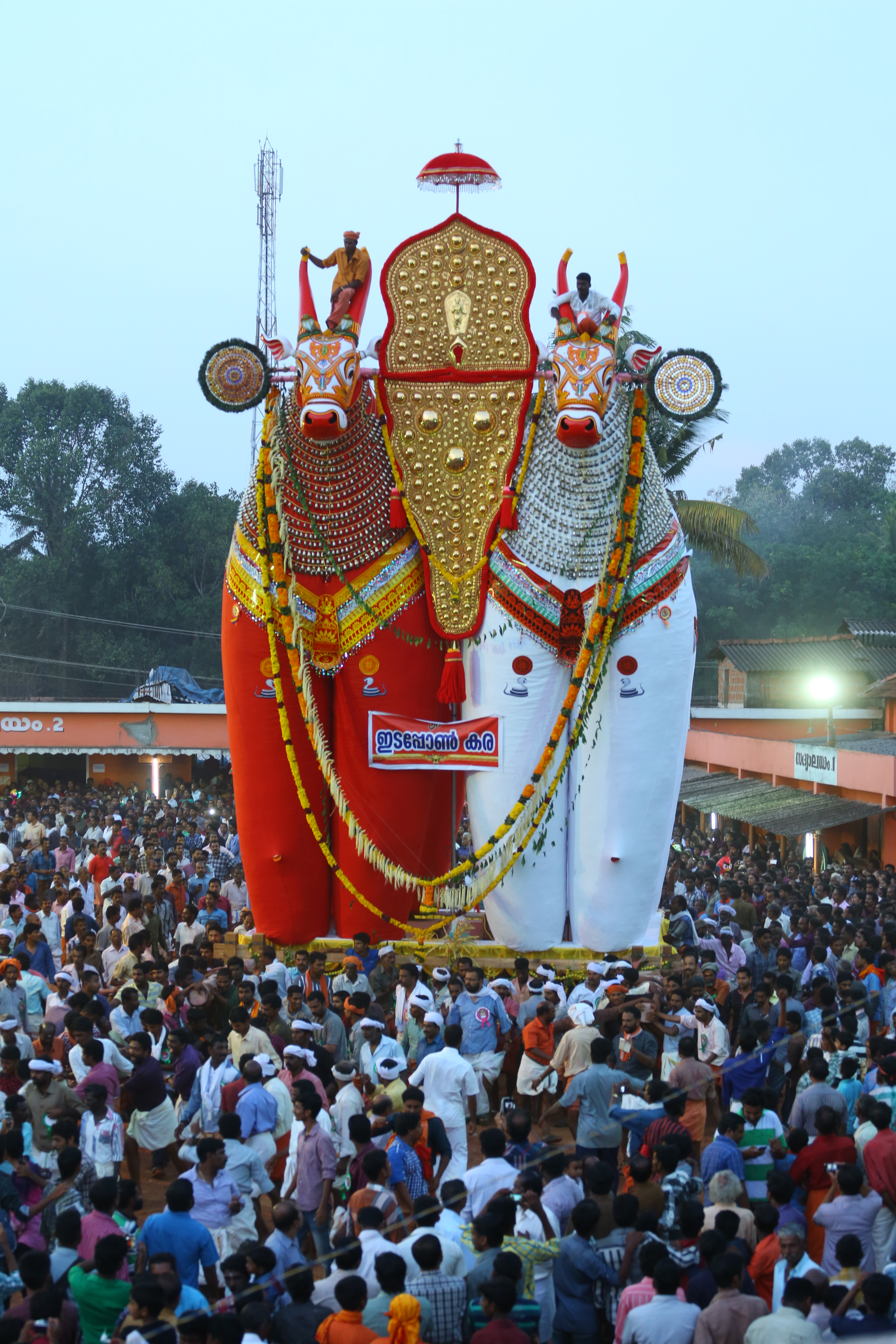
Nandikeshan from Edappon kara

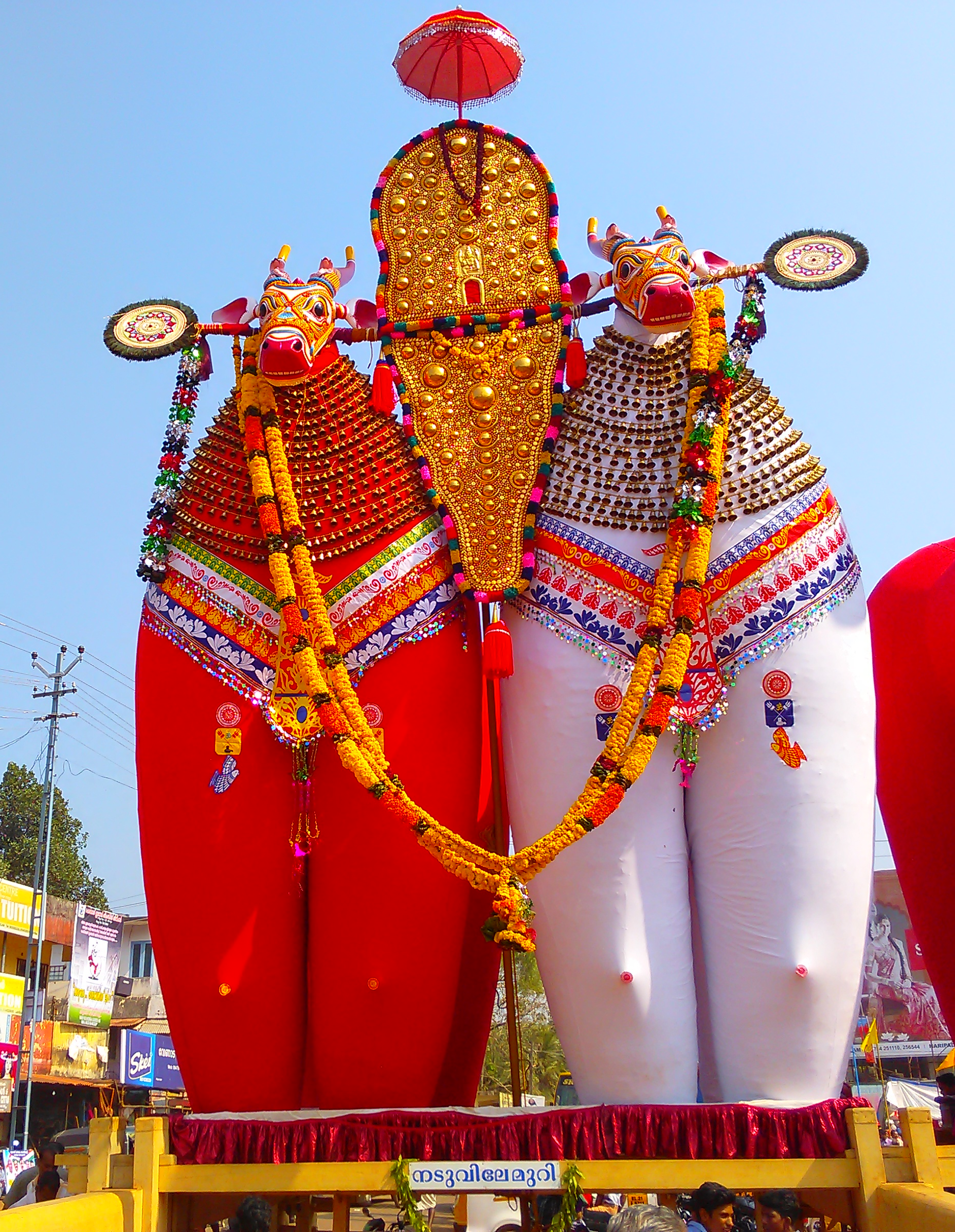
Nandikeshan from Naduvilemuri kara

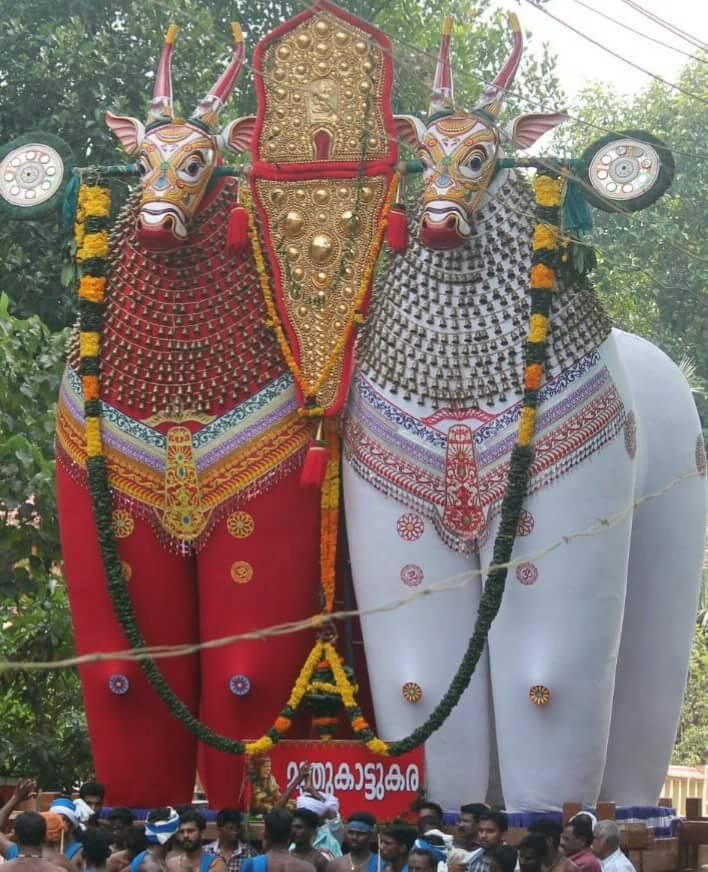
Nandikeshan from Muthukattu kara

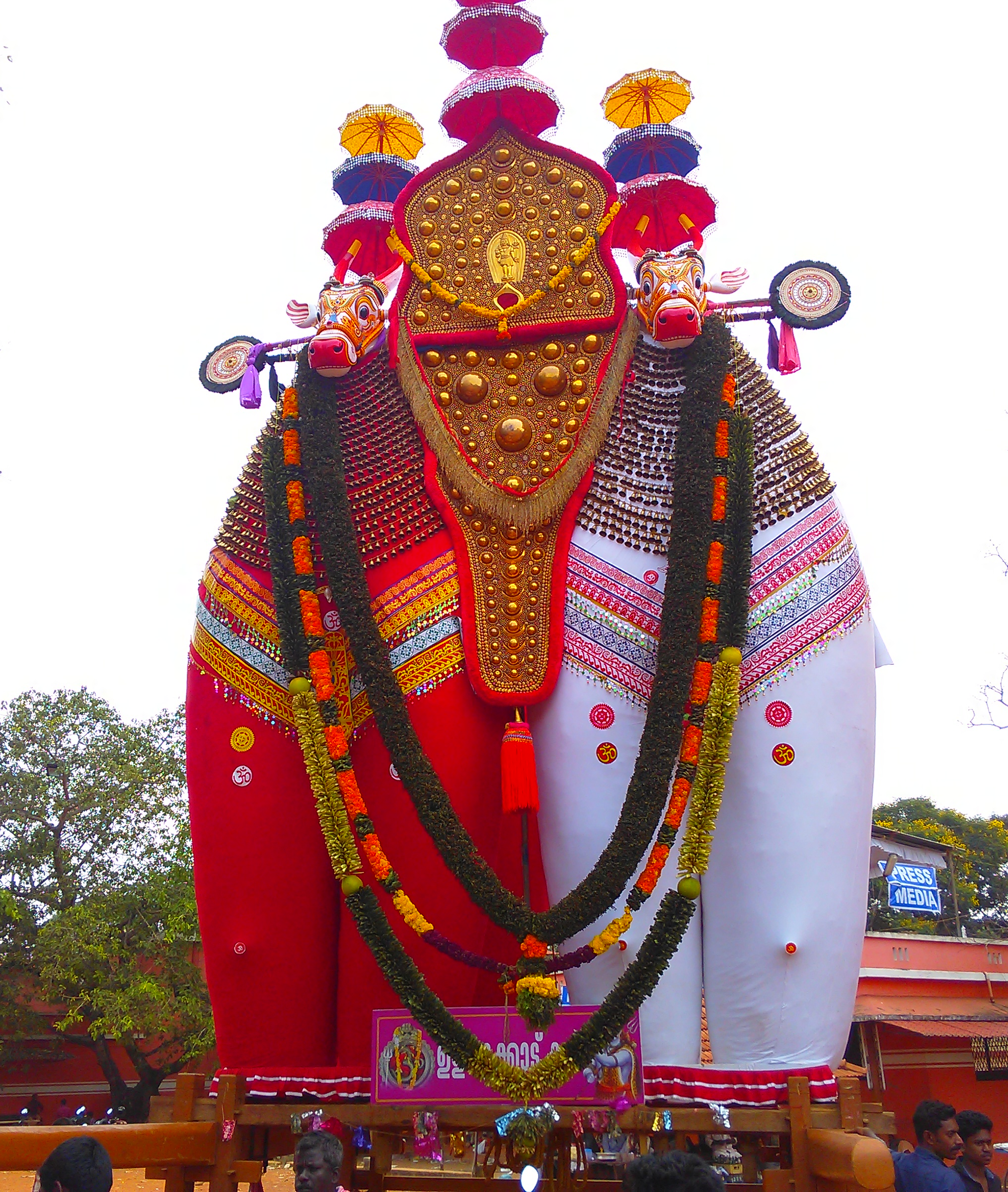
Nandikeshan from Ulavukkad kara

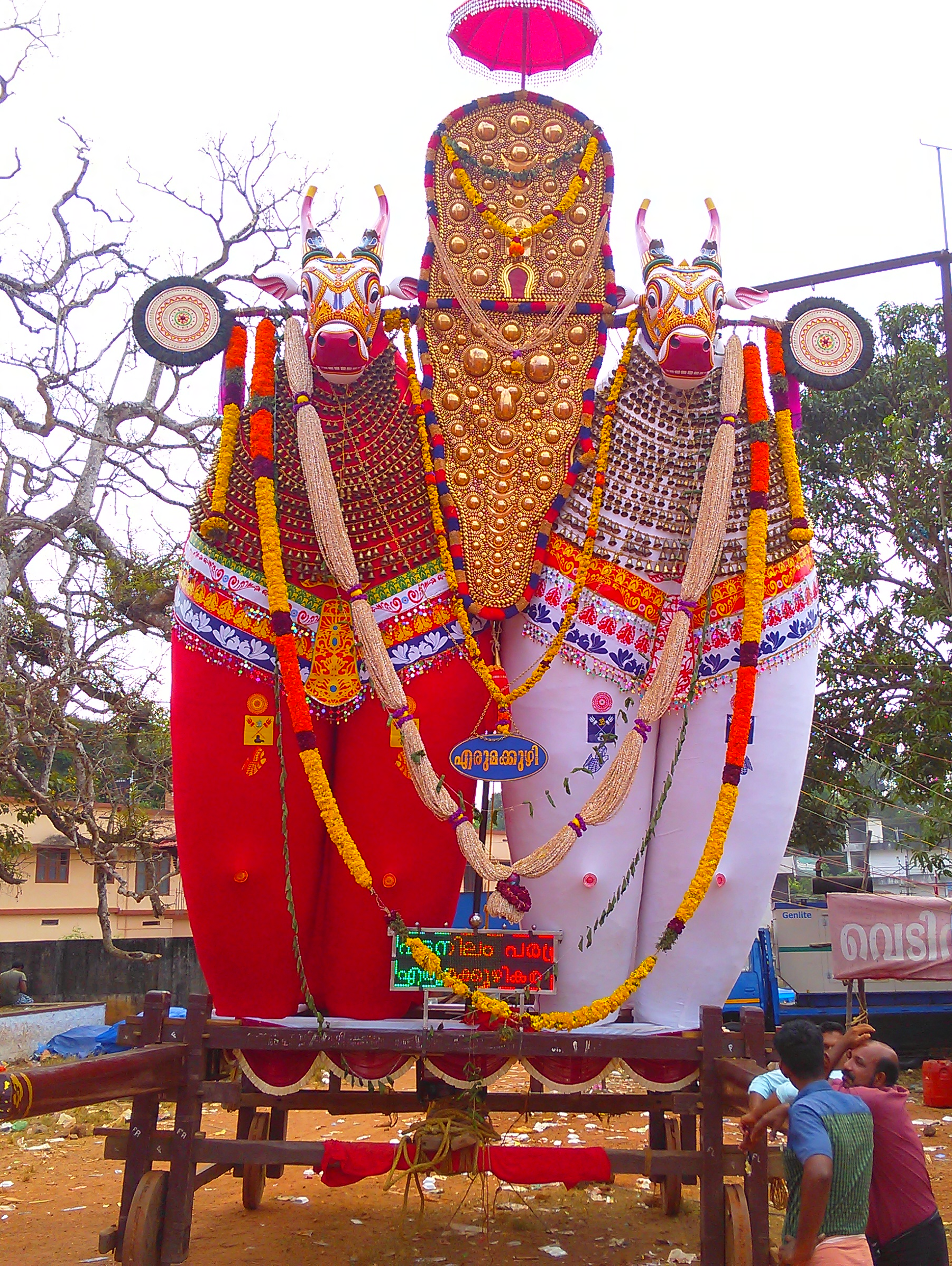
Nandikeshan from Erumakuzhy kara

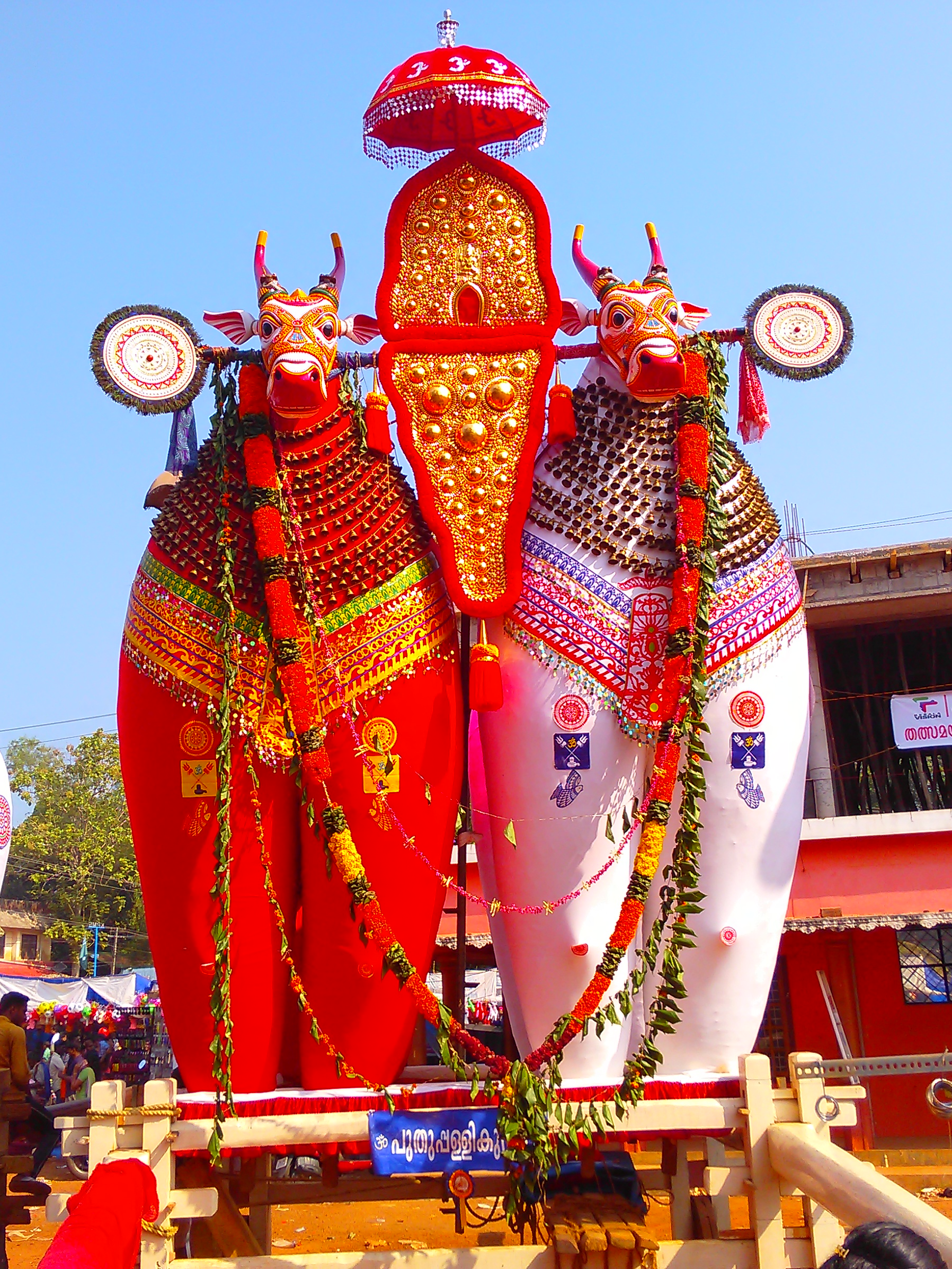
Nandikeshan from Puthupallikunnam kara

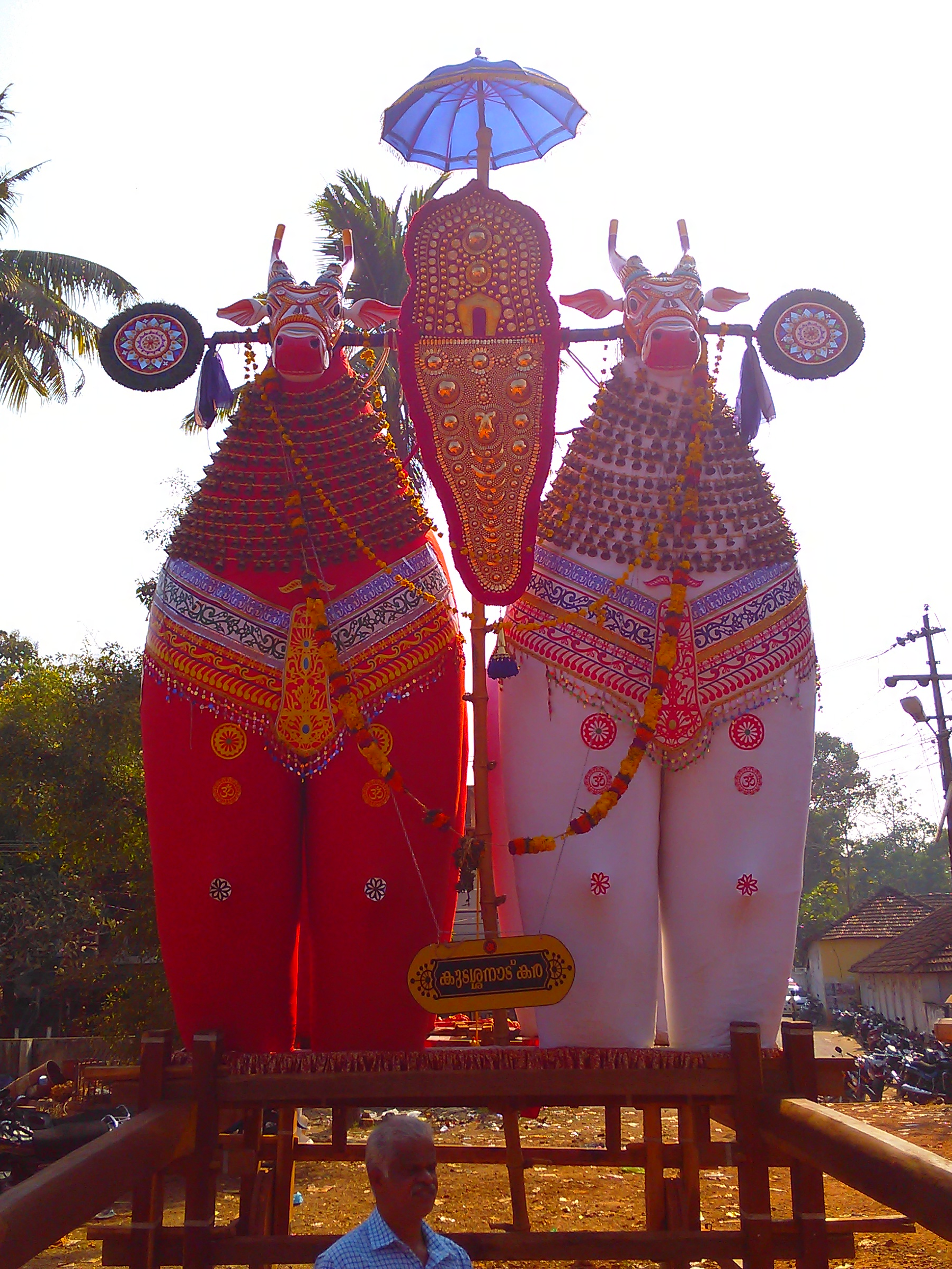
Nandikeshan from Kudassanad kara

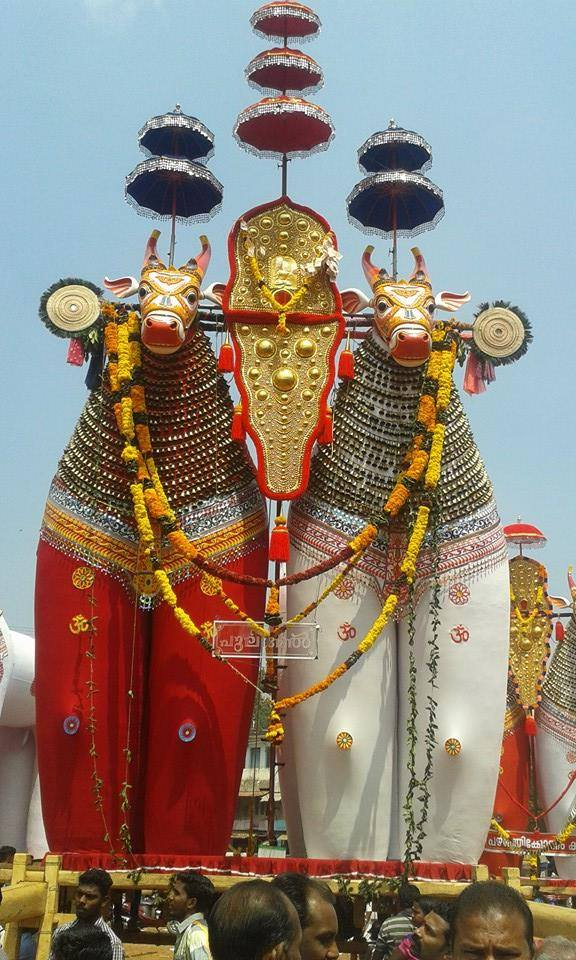
Nandikeshan from Pulimel kara

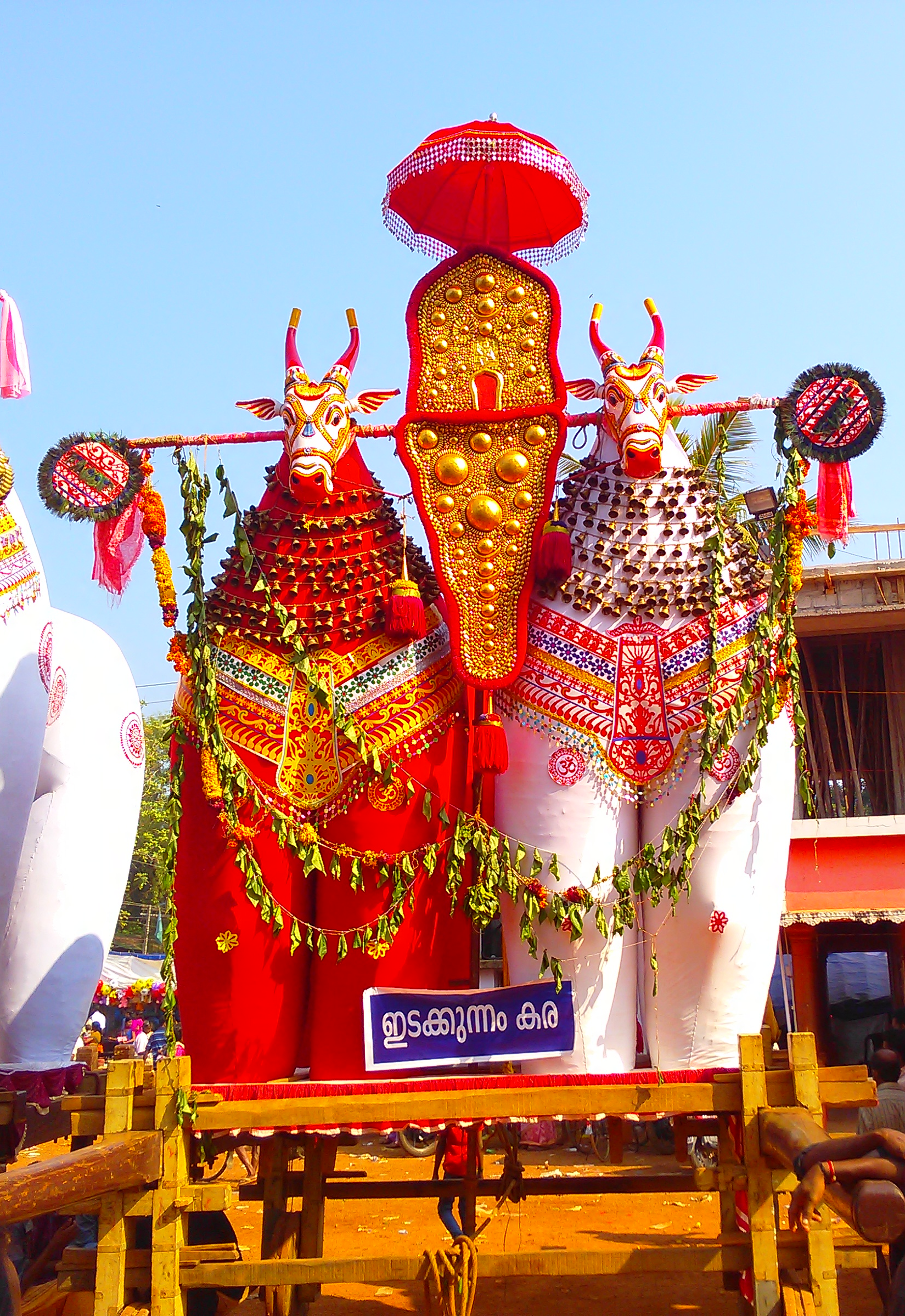
Nandikeshan from Edakkunnam kara

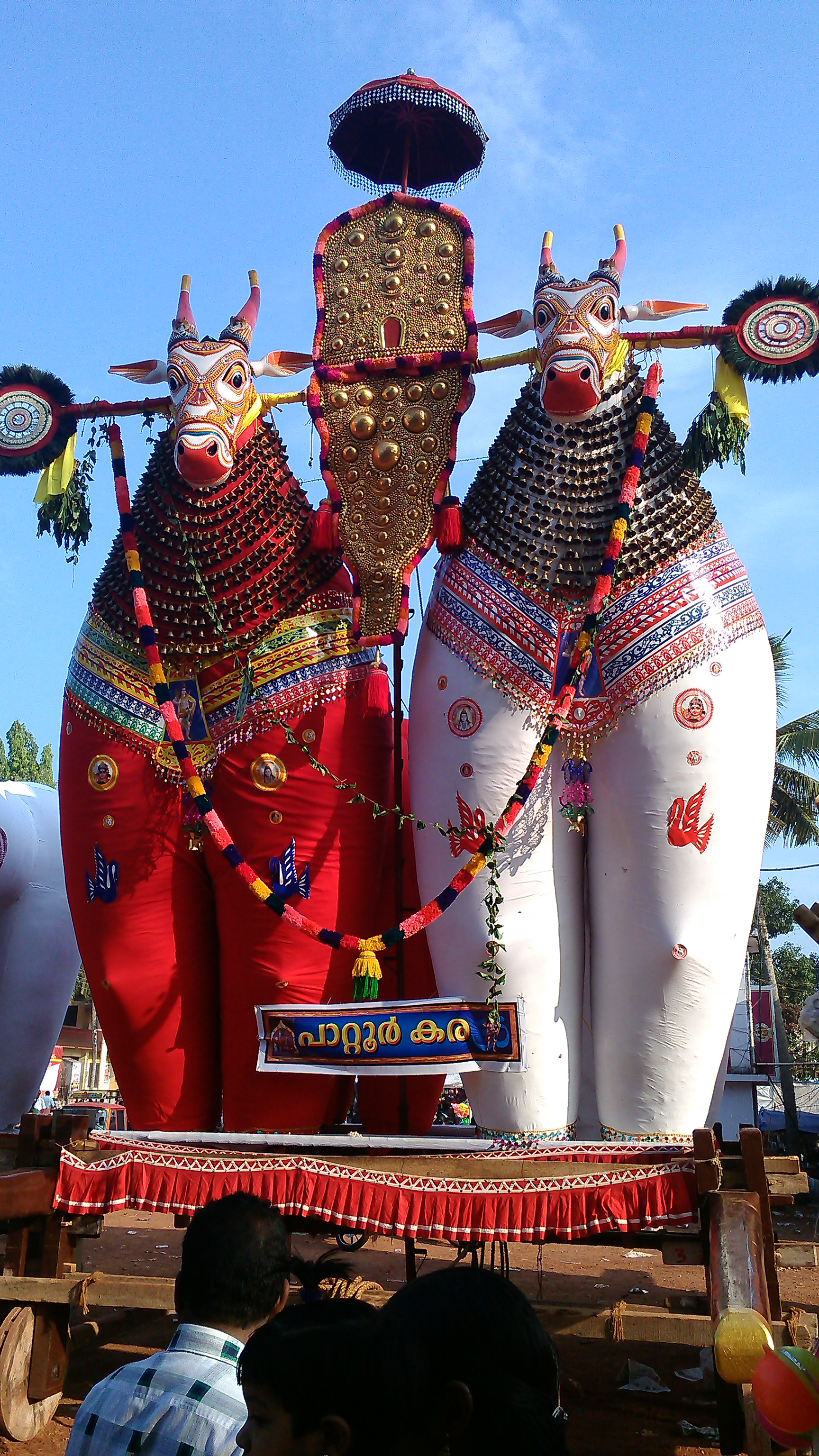
Nandikeshan from Pattor kara

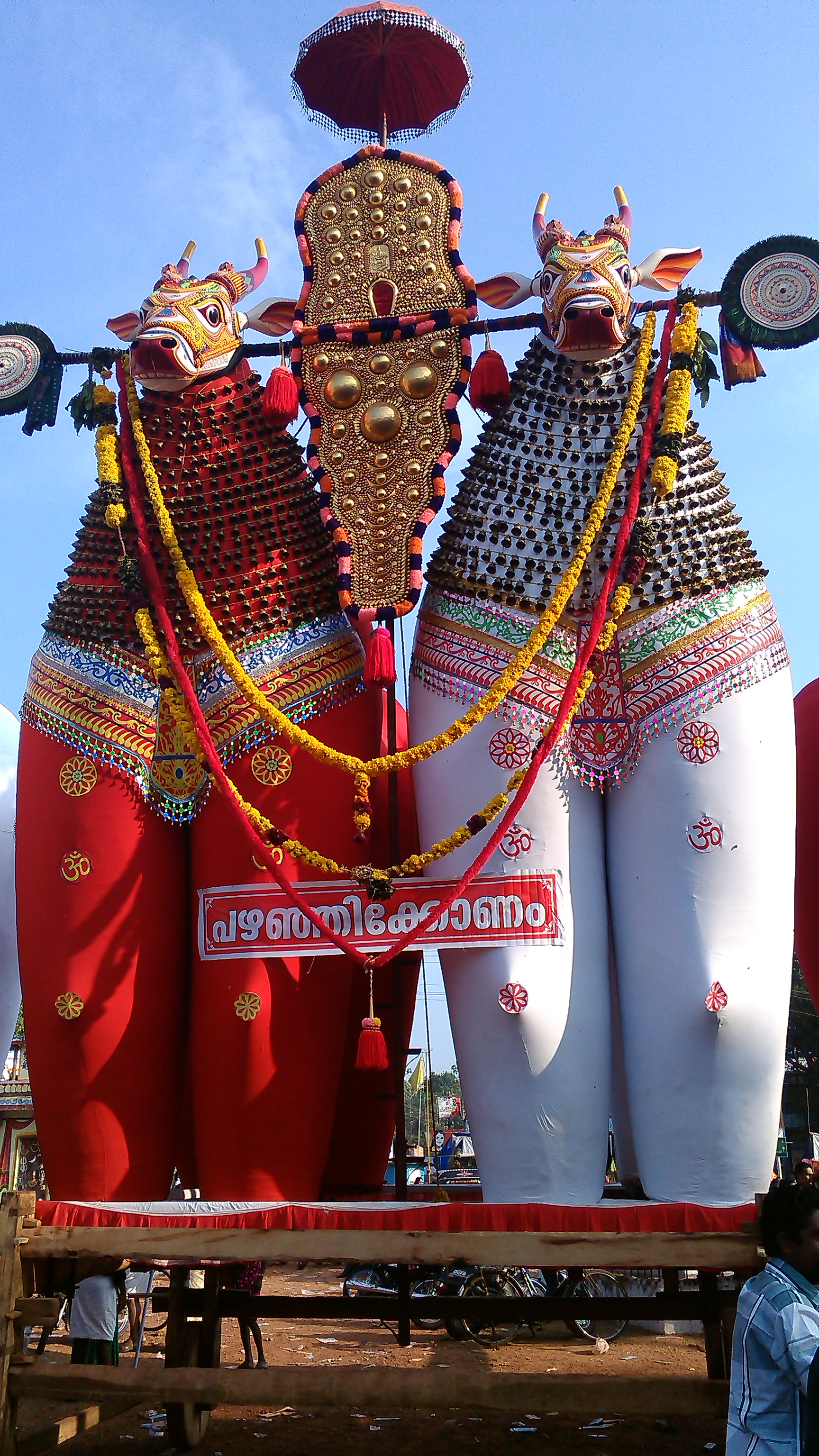
Nandikeshan from Pazhanjikonam kara

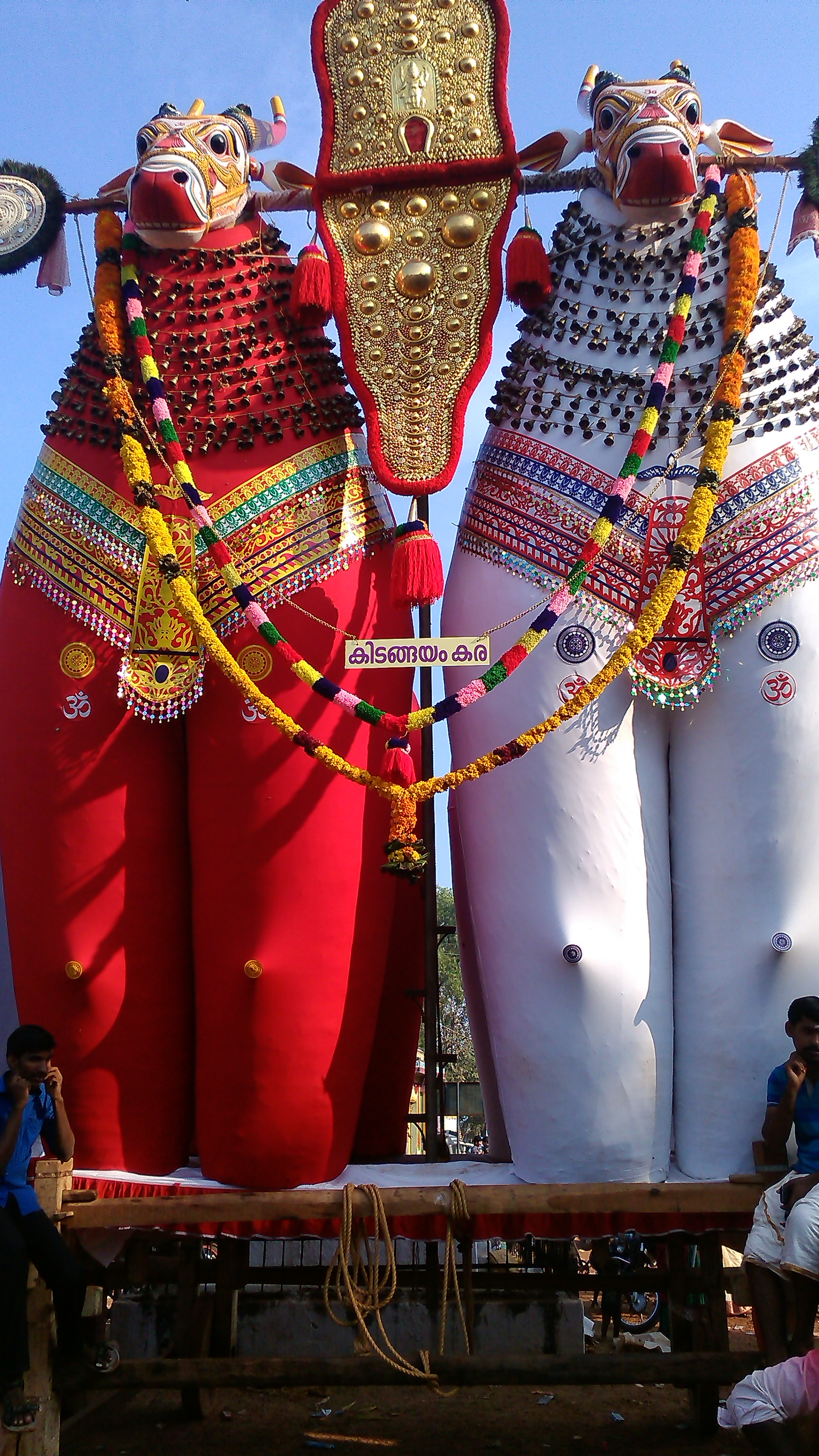
Nandikeshan from Kidangayam kara

== Other festivals ==
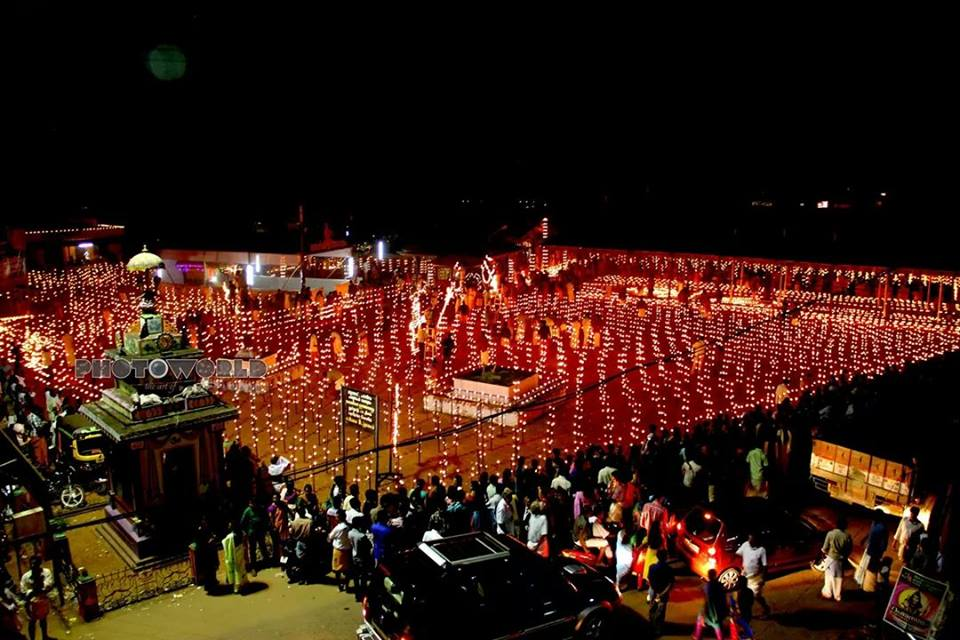
Lakshadeepam at the temple during mandala chirapp

Other festivals in the temple include:

- Vrischika mahotsavam, which is celebrated during the first 12 days of the Malayalam month of vrischikam. The ending day of the festival is called Panthrand Vilakk. Each year during vrischika mahotsavam, temple administration gives the Parabrahma Chaithanya Award to notable personalities for their contributions in their respective fields.
- Irupathiyettamonam
- Mandala Chirappu
- Sapthaha yajnam

Many marriages are also conducted in this temple, because marriage in this temple is considered auspicious.

== How to reach ==
There are both private and KSRTC buses from the towns of Kayamkulam and Pandalam. There are buses from Pandalam, Kayamkulam, Pathanamthitta, Konni, Mavelikkara, Oachira, and Karunagapally passing through Padanilam. Padanilam is situated on the Kayamkulam-Pandalam-Pathanamthitta bus route.
