= Kandiyoor Sree Mahadeva Temple =

Hindu temple in Kerala, India

- കണ്ടിയൂർ മഹാദേവക്ഷേത്രം
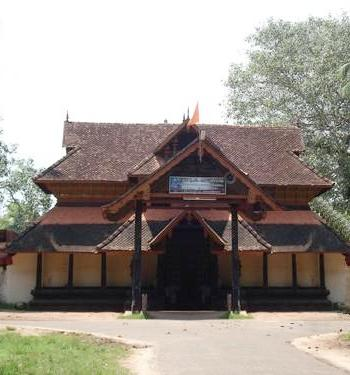

- Location in Kerala

Religion
- Affiliation: Hinduism
- District: Alappuzha
- Deity: Shiva
- Governing body: Travancore Devaswom Board

Location
- Location: Mavelikara
- State: Kerala
- Country: India
- Interactive map of Kandiyoor Sree Mahadeva Temple
- Coordinates: 9°15′11″N 76°31′46″E

Architecture
- Type: Traditional Kerala style
- Creator: Cheraman Perumal Nayanar Rajasekara Varman
- Established: Before the advent of Kali Yuga
- Completed: 823 AD

Kandiyoor Sree Mahadeva Temple is an ancient Shiva temple situated in Kandiyoor near Mavelikkara on the banks of Achankovil river. Kandiyoor was once the capital of the Odanadu kingdom. The temple and region are related to the history of ancient Buddhism in Kerala. Mattom Sree Mahadeva Temple also known as shiva nada is 1 kilometre (0.62 mi) west of Mavelikkara town north of State Highway 6. It is spread across an area of 7.5 acres (3.0 ha).

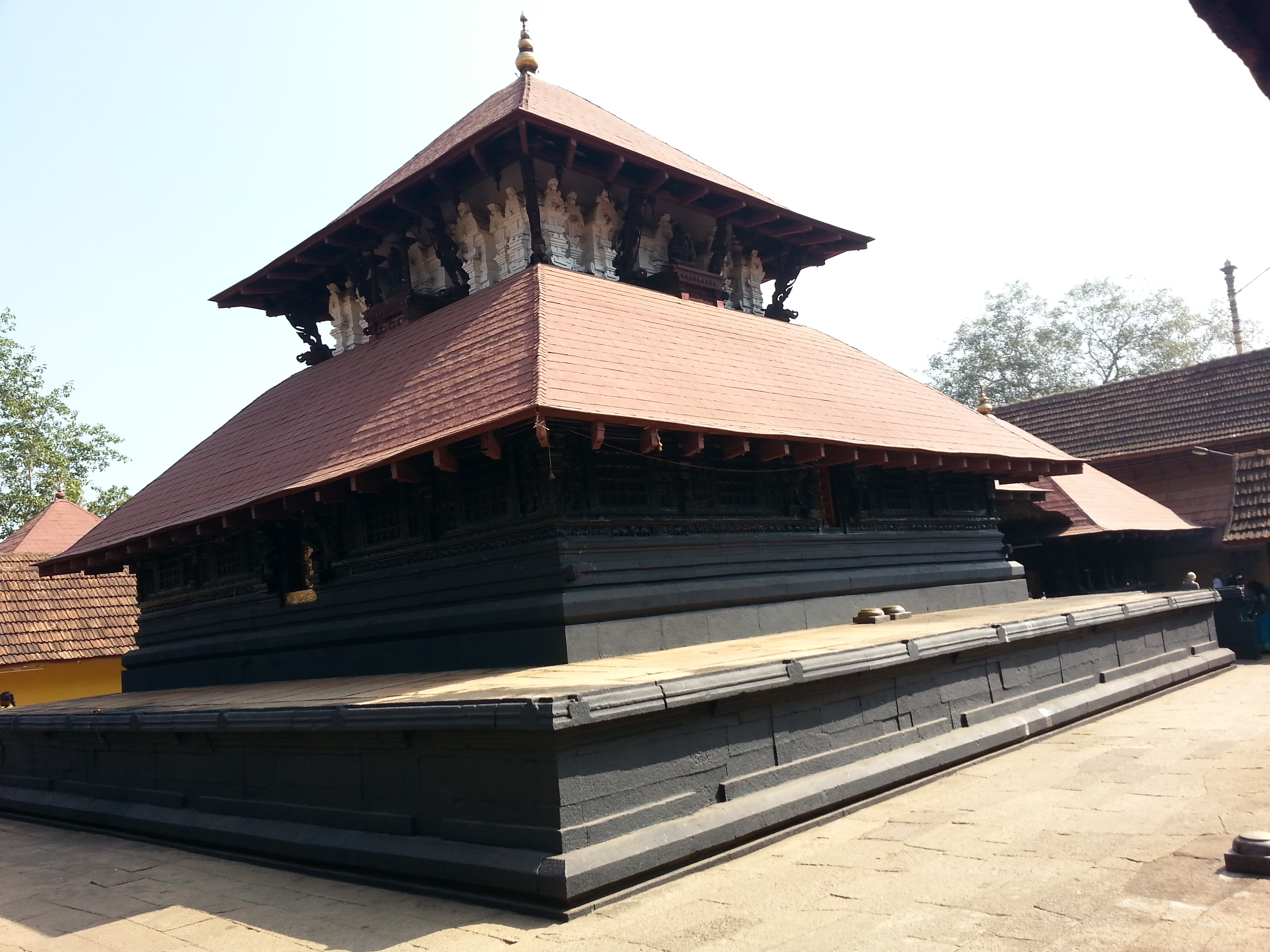
Sreekovil of Kandiyoor Temple

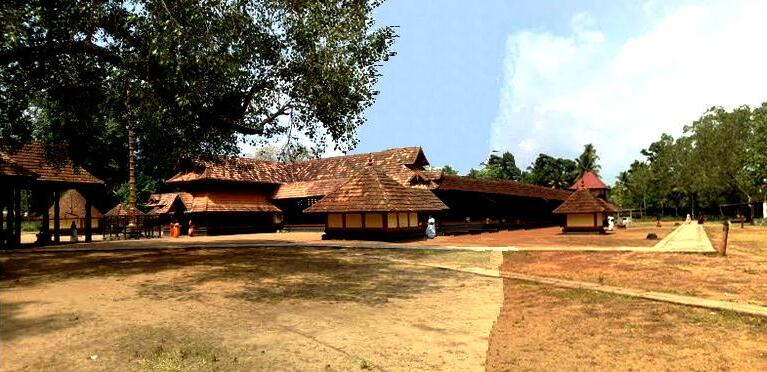
The temple compound (Mathilakam) of Kandiyur Maha Siva Temple

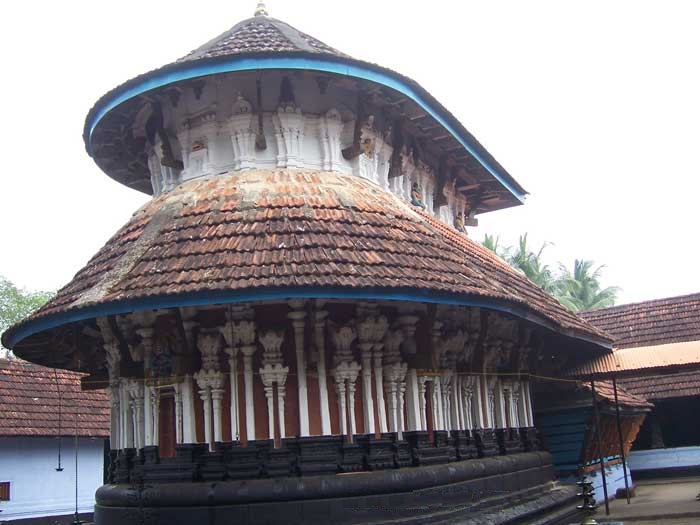
Kandiyoor Mahadeva Temple

== Legends ==
There are many legends associated with the temple. It is considered as one among the 108 great Shiva temples of ancient Kerala consecrated by Lord Parashurama himself. according to another legend the Rishi Mrikandu, the father of Rishi Markandeya got an idol of Lord Shiva in Kirathamoorthy form while bathing in Ganga. He heard an oracle that the idol be placed in a holy and befitting place. The Rishi searching for the apt location came to Kerala and ended up on the banks of Achankovil and established the temple in Kandiyoor. The name Kandiyoor is a corruption of Kandathil.

According to another legend the temple is located at the site where Lord Shiva cut off Lord Brahma's head. The name Kandiyoor comes from name of Shiva Sri Kantan. It is believed that Lord Parasurama renovated the temple and gave tantrik rights to Tharananallur family.

== History ==
Kandiyoor and the temple have great significance in Kerala's history. The Kandiyoor temple is the earliest temple about which there is an epigraph about its origin in A.D 823 during the reign of Rajasekhara Varman. There was an era name 'Kandiyoorabdam' from the formation of the temple that was in widespread use until the introduction of Kollavarsham.

It is also believed that there was a Hinayana Buddhist temple near to the Kandiyoor temple installed and managed by kannankara panicker family, It is also believed that it is this displaced Buddha that was retrieved from the nearby paddy fields and placed near the Mavelikkara Sree Krishna Swamy Temple (Buddha Junction) in recent times.

The Kandiyoor inscription (K. E. 393) dated 1218 says that Kandiyoor temple was reconstructed by Rama Kotha Varma of Odanad and the Kalasam ceremony was attended by Unniyachi, wife of Ravi Kerala Varma, King of Venad after deliberations between the three.

Kandiyoor was annexed to Kayamkulam by Kayamkulam Rajah and later to Travancore by Marthanda Varma. It is believed that during the war between Odanadu and Kayamkulam the defeated Kayamkulam Raja surrendered his sword in the temple and left through the rear door which still remains closed after centuries.

The temple is mentioned in Unnuneeli Sandesam written around the 14th century.

Sri Kandiyur Mahadeva Shastrikal - a Sanskrit Scholar who wrote many Bhashyams for Lalitha Sahasranamam, Lalitha Thrishati etc. lived in Kandiyoor.

== Temple Description ==
The primary deity of the temple is Lord Shiva known as Kandiyoorappan (the ruling deity of Kandiyoor). The deity is east facing. The rectangular sanctum santorum is two-tiered and there is a platform in the front for devotees, a feature that is of the Hoysala style. The bottom tier is oval in shape while the top tier is rectangular. The 10 feet (3.0 m) Gajaprishta style wall is believed to be constructed by Shiva's Bhoothaganas. There are puranic legend stone scriptures in the temple.

== Deity ==
The primary deity, Kandiyoorappan, is believed to be in Kirathamoorthy form. The deity is worshipped as Dakshinamoorthy in the morning, Umamaheshwaran in the noon, Kirathamoorthy in the evening. Deity is worshipped as Panchamukha from North-West corner of Pradakshina Vazhy by viewing five Thazikakudams of Shiva temples and as Vaikathappan (ruling deity of Vaikom) during sunset. The sub-deities in the temple include Vishnu, Parvatheesan, Nagaraja and Nagayakshi, Gosala Krishnan, Sastha, Sankaran, Sreekandan, Vadakkumnathan, Annapoorneswary, Ganapathy, Subrahmanyan, Moola Ganapathy and Brahmarakshas of which Sankara, Sreekanda, Vadakkumnadha, Parvatheesa and Mrityunjaya are Shiva himself. There are six Shivalinga Prathishtas in this temple.

== See also ==
- Temples of Kerala
- Temple festivals of Kerala
