= Mavelikara Maruthakshi Devi Temple =

- Maruthakshi Devi Temple, Mavelikkara, Alappuzha, Kerala

Religion
- Affiliation: Hinduism
- District: Alappuzha
- Deity: Maruthakshi Devi, Appuppan
- Festivals: Kumbham Aswathi Mahotsavam, Ponkala Maholsavam, Vrishchika Chirappu
- Governing body: Maruthakshi Devaswam

Location
- Location: Near Mavelikara Railway Station, Mavelikkara
- State: Kerala
- Country: India
- Interactive map of Mavelikara Maruthakshi Devi Temple
- Coordinates: 9°14′34.1″N 76°32′57.1″E

Architecture
- Type: Traditional Kerala style
- Completed: Records indicate the temple to be at least 60+ years old

Specifications
- Temple: One
- Elevation: 32.99 m (108 ft)

Mavelikara Maruthakshi Devi Temple is a Hindu temple in Mavelikkara, Kerala, in India.
