= Mavelikkara =

Town in Kerala, India

Mavelikara
- Municipality
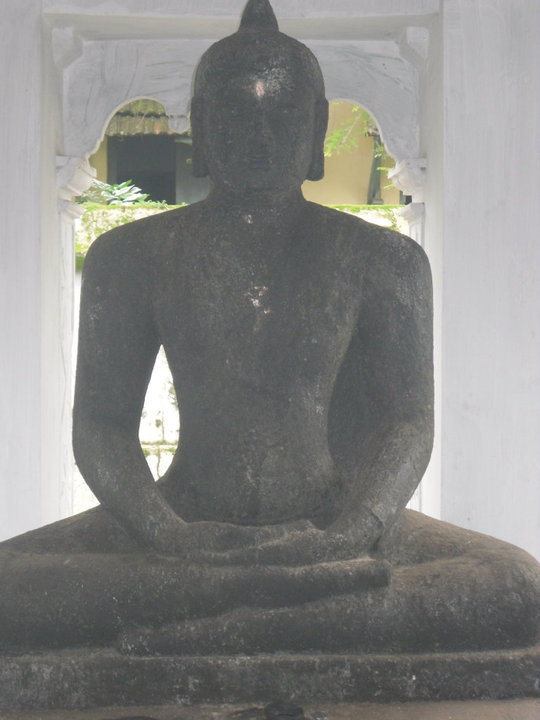

- Location in Kerala, India Mavelikara (India)
- Coordinates: 9.267°N 76.55°E
- Country: India
- State: Kerala
- District: Alappuzha
- Named for: Mahabali

Government
  - Type: Taluk
  - Body: Municipal Council
  - MP: Kodikunnil Suresh
  - MLA: M S Arun Kumar

Area
  - Total: 12.65 km^{2} (4.88 sq mi)

Population (2011)
  - Total: 26,421
  - Density: 2,089/km^{2} (5,409/sq mi)

Languages
  - Official: Malayalam, English
- Time zone: UTC+5:30 (IST)
- PIN: 690101
- Telephone code: +91-479
- Vehicle registration: KL-31
- Nearest cities: Pathanamthitta (33 km), Alappuzha (43 km) Kottayam (44 km), , Kollam (46 km)
- Literacy: 92.3%
- Website: mavelikaramunicipality.lsgkerala.gov.in

Mavelikkara (IPA: [ma:ʋe:lik:aɾa]) is a municipality in Alappuzha district of Kerala, India. Mavelikara is situated approximately 43 km south of Alappuzha, the district headquarters, and about 121 km north of Thiruvananthapuram, the state capital. It lies roughly 33 km west of Pathanamthitta, another district headquarters in proximity. Mavelikara is also equidistant from the district headquarters of Alappuzha, Kottayam, and Kollam. As per the 2011 Indian census, Mavelikkara has a population of 26,421 people, and a population density of 2,088/km^{2} (5,410/sq mi).

Mavelikkara was the erstwhile capital of the feudal kingdom of Odanad and is today a primary economic and cultural hub of the Onattukara region.

== Etymology ==
The name Mavelikara is believed to be derived from the words Maveli or Mahabali, the mythical king of Kerala, and Kara means land. This land is believed to be the place 'Mattom Mahadeva temple where King Mahabali knelt before Vamana, offering his head for Vamana to keep his feet. Another belief is that "Ma" means prosperity, "Veli" means extent, and "Kara" means land.

== Background ==
Mavelikara was a major centre of trade and commerce in ancient Kerala and the erstwhile capital of the rulers of Onattukara. As a result of the close association with the Travancore Royal Family, Mavelikara gained modern facilities well ahead of other places in the state. It is one of the oldest municipalities of the state. Even before India attained independence, Mavelikara had a super express transport service to Trivandrum.

The town boasts about a rich historical and cultural background. The place is home to one of the 108 Shiva temples of Kerala created by Lord Parashurama, the Kandiyoor Mahadeva Temple. Mavelikara Sree Krishna Swami Temple, Sree Krishna Swami Temple is managed and owned by the Travancore Devaswom board. The Chettikulangara Devi Temple, known for the Kumbha Bharani festival is located near the municipality. The only sarvam swayambhu shiva Temple in India is situated in Chunakkara, Mavelikara.

The town also has the famous St. Mary's Orthodox Cathedral founded in the year 943 AD and affiliated with the Malankara Orthodox Syrian Church. The church is locally referred to as "Puthiyacavu Pally" and is known for holding the Mavelikara Padiyola in 1836 in which the Malankara Orthodox Church refused the anglicization attempts of the British and severed ties with them. The church is also the diocesan cathedral of the Mavelikara Diocese in close proximity to Malankara Syrian Seminary in Thazhakara which hosts the Theobhavan Aramana and bishop's residence. The Mavelikara Diocese is currently headed by Vattamparambil Dr. Abraham Mar Epiphanios with about 80 parishes and a dozen chapels.

== Demographics ==
As of 2011 Census, Mavelikara had a population of 26,421 with 12,070 males and 14,351 females. Mavelikara Municipality has an area of 12.65 km^{2} (4.88 sq mi) with 7,184 families residing in it. The average female sex ratio was 1189 higher than the state average of 1084. 7.7% of the population was under 6 years of age. Mavelikara had an average literacy of 96.9% higher than the state average of 94%: male literacy was 97.8% and female literacy was 96.2%.

Year	Total Population	Male	Female	Change	Religion (%)							
Year	Total Population	Male	Female	Change	Hindu	Muslim	Christian	Sikhs	Buddhist	Jain	Other religions and persuasions	Religion not stated
2001	28439	13506	14933	-	70.94	0.98	28.02	0.00	0.02	0.00	0.00	0.04
2011	26421	12070	14351	-7.10%	72.22	1.04	26.49	0.02	0.02	0.00	0.05	0.17

== Transport ==
=== Bus ===
Kerala State Road Transport Corporation has a sub depot at Mavelikara (Station Code: MVKA) which is one among the 46 sub depots in the state. The KSRTC sub depot at Mavelikara has an inter state bus service which is operated to Tenkasi every day; 2 trips morning & evening via Kayamkulam, Kattanam.

The Municipal Private bus stand is located at Mitchel Junction with buses to Chengannur, Pathanamthitta, Adoor, Pandalam, Thiruvalla, Haripad, Kayamkulam, Changanassery.

=== Rail ===
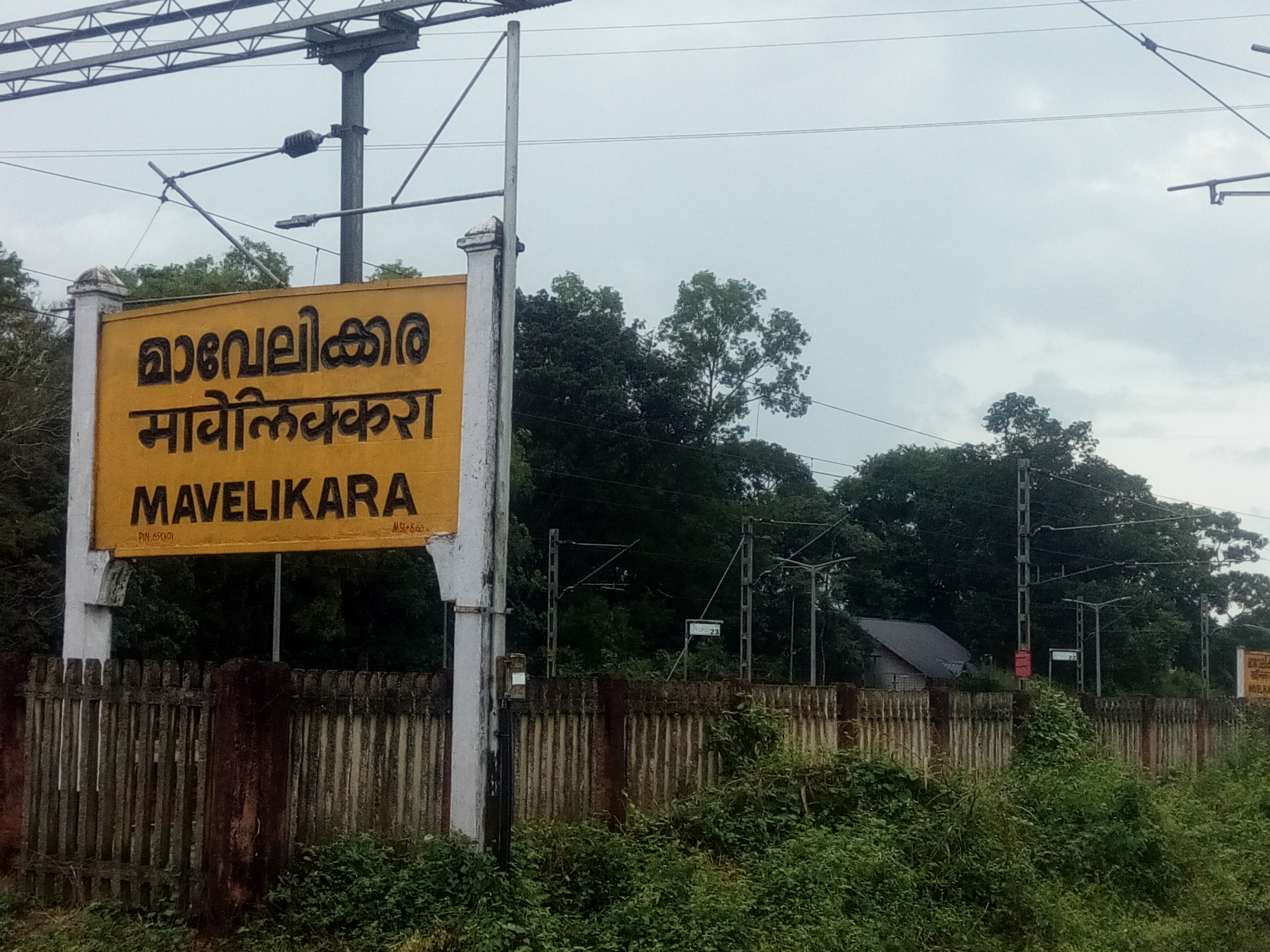
Mavelikara Railway Station

Mavelikara railway station (Station Code:MVLK) is a mainline station in the Trivandrum Division of the Southern Railway Zone (India), with connections to New Delhi, Mumbai, Chennai, Kolkata, Bangalore, Hyderabad, Ahmedabad, Pune, Mangalore, Bhopal, Guwahati, Nagpur and Jammu. Other nearby stations are Kayamkulam Junction railway station, Chengannur Railway Station, Haripad railway station and Kollam Junction railway station.

=== Air & Road connectivity ===
- Airports: The nearest major airports are Thiruvananthapuram (Trivandrum) International Airport (115 km) and Cochin International Airport (127 km).
- Roads: Kerala State Highway 10 (SH 10) originates in Mavelikara, providing regional connectivity.

== Economy ==
Local industries in and around Mavelikara include:

- KSRTC Regional Workshop and Bus Body Building Centre Mavelikara
- ALIND Switchgear, Mannar

Several small-scale industries are present in the Industrial Estate (an initiative of SIDCO) located at Kollakadavu.

== Politics ==
=== Lok Sabha ===
Mavelikara has its own constituency in the Lok Sabha. Until the 2002 Lok Sabha Delimitation took effect in 2008, the constituency consisted of Chengannur, Mavelikara, Kayamkulam, Pandalam, Thiruvalla and Kallupara. Since then, the assembly constituencies have comprised Changanassery, Kuttanad, Mavelikara (SC), Chengannur, Kunnathur (SC), Kottarakara and Pathanapuram. The constituency is now reserved for a scheduled caste candidate.

Kodikunnil Suresh of the INC has represented the Mavelikara constituency since 2009.

=== State Assembly ===
M. S. Arun Kumar from the CPI(M) is the representative of Mavelikara in the Kerala Legislative Assembly.

== Culture ==
The cultural capital of Alappuzha is Mavelikara. Mavelikara was once part of the principality of Onattukara and has been a centre of religious harmony, culture and arts for several centuries.

Mavelikara is home to the Statue of Buddha in Seated Position, which dates back to the 9th century AD.

== Places of worship ==
Notable places of worship include:-

- Chettikulangara Devi Temple, founded in AD 823, is a Bhagawathy Temple. The major festival is Chettikulangara Kumbha Bharani.
- Kandiyoor Sree Mahadeva Temple, also known as Dakshina Kashi Founded in AD 731
- Mavelikara Maruthakshi Devi Temple, Mavelikara

== Educational institutions ==
- Bishop Moore College, Kallumala, Mavelikara
- Jawahar Navodaya Vidyalaya, Chennithala
- Raja Ravi Varma College of Fine Arts, Mavelikara

== Hospitals ==
- Sreekantapuram hospital
- Govt.hospital, Mavelikara
- VSM hospital
- Meepallikutti hospital

== Notable people ==
- Abu Abraham, cartoonist and writer
- P. C. Alexander, principal Secretary to former Prime Ministers Indira Gandhi and Rajiv Gandhi, member of the Malankara Orthodox Syrian Church.
- Zacharias Athanasios, 3rd Bishop of Tiruvalla - Cherian Polachirackal, originally from Mavelikara, raised in the Malankara Orthodox Syrian Church.
- His Holiness Baselios Marthoma Didymos I, leader of Malankara Orthodox Syrian Church, 20th Malankara Metropolitan and 7th Catholicos of the Malankara Church
- Ramesh Chennithala, home minister, leader of the Opposition in the Kerala Legislative Assembly
- Manu S. Pillai, writer and historian
- Ramayyan Dalawa, the chief minister and friend of marthandavarma- the kavu in front of municipal office is in his name
- Archbishop Aboon Geevarghese Ivanios, founding father of the Syro–Malankara Catholic Church, originally a bishop from the Malankara Orthodox Syrian Church
- T. K. Madhavan, Reformist leader of modern Kerala
- Kaziah Mejo, Miss Universe India 2026
- Geevarghese Osthathios, Bishop of Malankara Orthodox Syrian Church, theologian, orator and writer
- Rahul Panicker, award-winning innovator, entrepreneur, scientist
- Divya Pillai, actress
- A. V. Vasudevan Potti, poet and lyricist
- Shaji Prabhakaran, Former football Consultant (FIFA, AFC)
- Narendra Prasad, college professor, actor, author
- Justice C. T. Ravikumar, Judge Supreme Court of India
- C. M. Stephen, Leader of Congress and the INTUC, he is the first opposition leader of congress, a devoted member of the Malankara Orthodox Syrian Church
- K. P. A. C. Sulochana, actress and playback singer
- P. G. N. Unnithan, the last Diwan (Prime Minister) of independent Travancore
- M. S. Valiathan, cardiac surgeon, former President of the Indian National Science Academy and National Research Professor
- A. R. Raja Raja Varma, grammarian and poet
- Raja Ravi Varma, artist
- Ravindra Varma, minister for Labour and Parliamentary Affairs in the Morarji Desai Ministry in India from 1977 to 1979
- R. Marthanda Varma, India's first neurosurgeon and developer of a surgical technique for treating Parkinson's disease
- Vishnupriya- Malayalam film actress
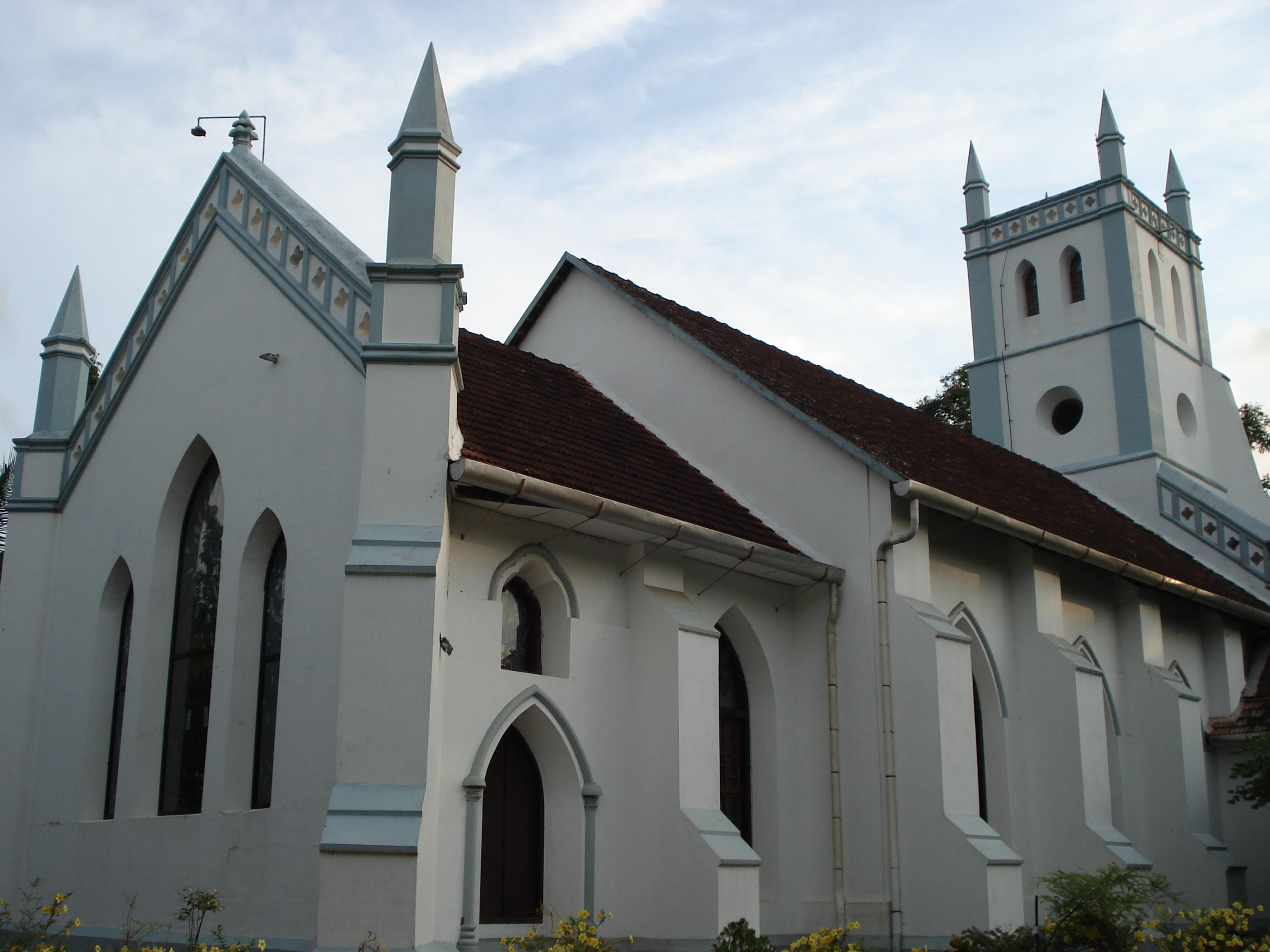
- CSI church
  Yesudasan, cartoonist and member of the Malankara Orthodox Syrian Church

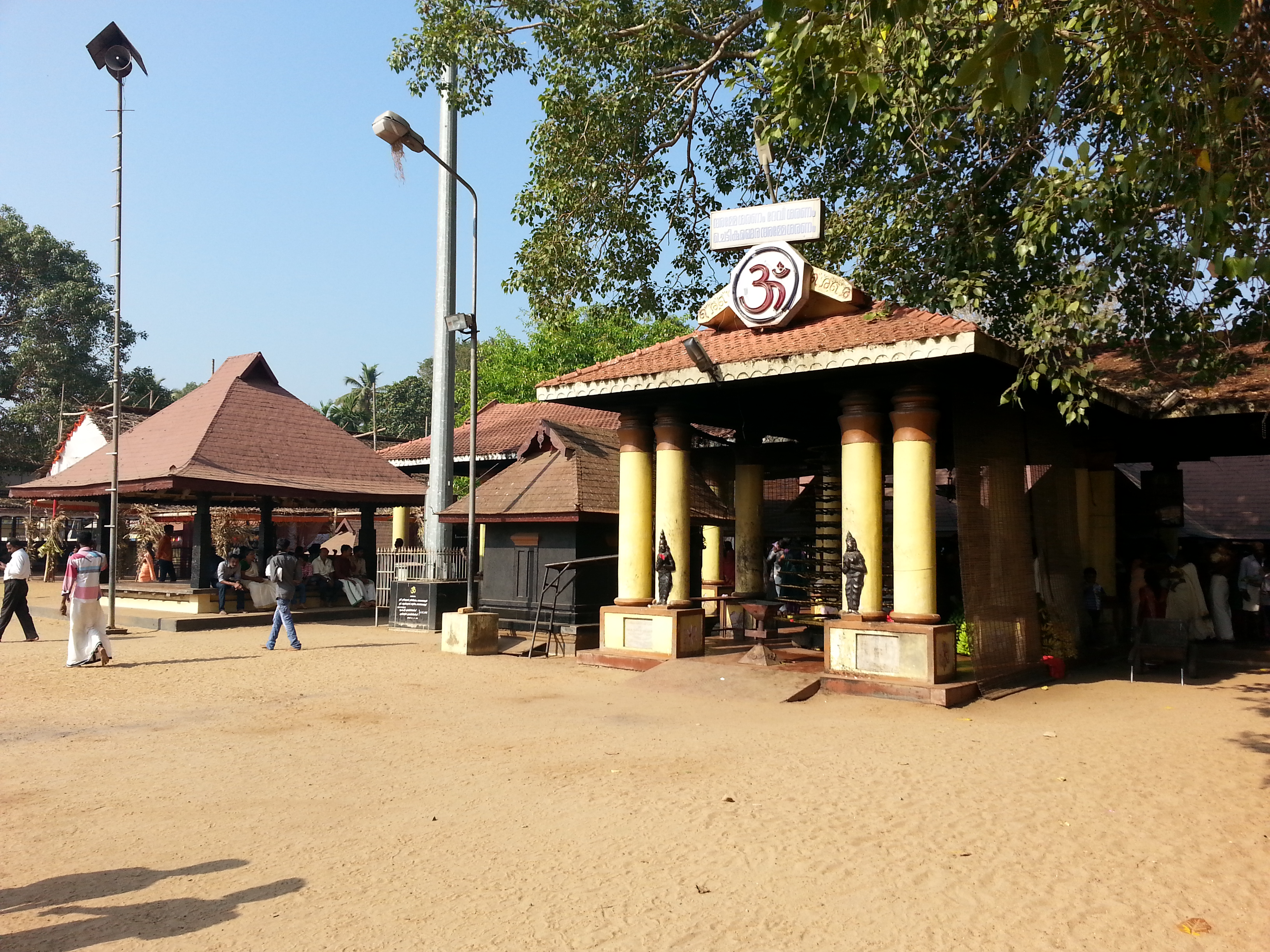
Chettikulangara Temple

== See also ==
- Charummood
- Chettikulangara
- Karunagappalli
- Mannar
- Mavelikara (Lok Sabha constituency)
- kayamkulam
- Padanilam
- Thriperumthura
- Vallikunnam
