= Diocese of Madhya Kerala of the Church of South India =

Diocese of the Church of South India in Kerala, India

Diocese of Madhya Kerala
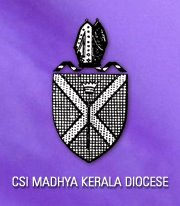

Location
- Country: India
- Ecclesiastical province: Church of South India
- Headquarters: Kottayam

Statistics
- Churches: 393
- Members: 0.35 million

Information
- Denomination: Church of South India
- Established: 1879
- Cathedral: Holy Trinity Cathedral, Kottayam
- Secular priests: 197
- Language: Malayalam, English

Current leadership
- Bishop: Rt. Rev. Dr. Malayil Sabu Koshy Cherian

Website
- https://csimadhyakeraladiocese.org

The Madhya Kerala Diocese is one of the twenty-four dioceses of the Church of South India (CSI), a United Protestant denomination covering the central part of Kerala.

When the Church of South India was formed on 27 September 1947, the diocese was called the Diocese of Central Travancore. The diocese was formed from the ecclesiastical territories of Protestant denominations in India, including the Diocese of Travancore and Cochin of the Church of India, Burma and Ceylon (Anglican) that was founded in 1879, the South India United Church (Congregationalist, Presbyterian and Continental Reformed), and the southern district of the Methodist Church.

== History ==
The history of the Madhya Kerala Diocese dates back to the work of the Church Missionary Society in the state of Travancore. R.H. Kerr and Claudius Buchanan, visited the Malabar Syrians in 1806, during the episcopate of Mar Dionysius I. Lord William Bentinck sent Kerr to Travancore for the purpose of investigating the state of the native church. During the British period, CMS missionaries started a relationship with Saint Thomas Christians; a division occurred between Orthodox Syrian Christians and a minority from the Church, who were in favor of the Reformed theology of the CMS missionaries. According to some estimates, about 6,000–12,000 Orthodox Syrian Christians joined the Church of India, Burma and Ceylon in 1837; these were known as Syrian Anglicans.

Early in 1876, the Society began negotiations with the Secretary of State for India so that a new diocese can be formed under the Jerusalem Bishopric Act for the Church of England in the Native States of Travancore and Cochin. The Diocese of Travancore and Cochin (in the Church of India, Burma and Ceylon) was erected with its See at Kottayam in 1879 and John Speechly, then Principal of the Cambridge Nicholson Institute (CMS Theological college, Kottayam), was announced as the first Bishop of Travancore and Cochin. Speechly was consecrated a bishop on 25 July 1879 at St Paul's Cathedral; he arrived at Kottayam on 27 January 1880.

In 1888, Speechly left for England and was unable to return, and Noel Hodges (1890–1904), a CMS Missionary from Ceylon followed him as diocesan bishop. He was installed in the Pro-Cathedral, Kottayam in November 1890. During the episcopate of Hodges, the first missionary enterprise of the diocese was organised as its Home Mission, was started at Adoor in 1903. Hodges retired in 1905 and was succeeded by Hope Gill (1905–1925), who was consecrated in Westminster Abbey and arrived in Kottayam in 1906. The full creation of Diocesan structures which began in 1879 was fulfilled in 1920, when Gill constituted, "Travancore and Cochin Diocesan Council" to assist in the management of the temporal affairs and financial business of the church.

On 27 September 1947, the four southernmost dioceses of Church of India, Burma and Ceylon (CIBC), the South India United Church (Congregationalist, Presbyterian and Continental Reformed), and the southern district of the Methodist Church merged to form the Church of South India, a United Protestant denomination. The presiding bishop at the CSI's inauguration was C. K. Jacob, Bishop of Travancore and Cochin who became Bishop in Central Travancore. The diocese's territory was reduced and renamed the Diocese of Central Travancore. Subsequently, it has been renamed the Diocese of Madhya Kerala after the state of Kerala was formed in 1956 — Madhya is Hindi for central.

Due to the presence of CSI Syriac Christians in the Church of South India, churches of Malankara Orthodox Syrian Church (in Oriental Orthodox Communion, autocephalous), Malankara Jacobite Syriac Orthodox Church (in Oriental Orthodox Communion, under Antioch) and Malankara Mar Thoma Syrian Church do interact frequently on occasions such as family gathering and marriages.

== Administration ==
The Diocese has a Diocesan Council which governs the diocese. All the clergy of the diocese and elected laymen from the local congregations are the members of the Diocesan Council.

The diocese is divided into two zones (North Zone and South Zone), each headed by a District Minister. And it is further divided into twelve District Councils. The bishop of the diocese is assisted by the Executive Committee, formed by an election from the Diocesan Council.

The Diocesan Headquarters is at Kottayam, Kerala. The Bishop's House and a Retreat Centre is in the campus of the Headquarters.

The Diocese also publishes an official newsletter named Njananikshepam (The Treasury of Knowledge) every month. The newsletter was published first in the year 1848 from C.M.S. press, Kottayam.

=== Bishops ===
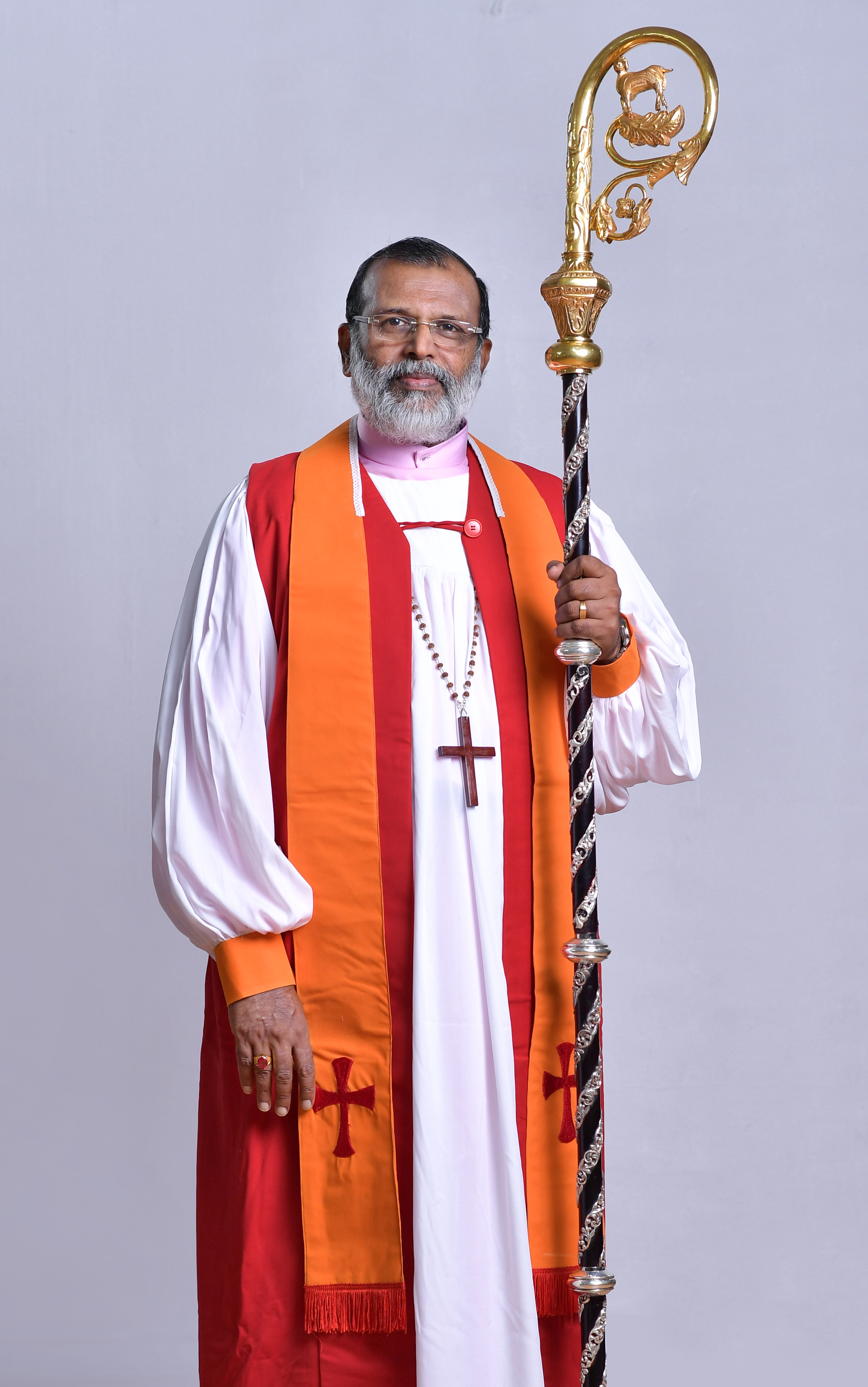
Bishop Malayil Sabu Koshy Cherian

Anglican Bishops of Travancore and Cochin

- John Speechly (1879–1889)
- Noel Hodges (1890–1904)
- Hope Gill (1905–1924)
- Edward Moore (1925–1937)
- Bernard Corfield (1938–1944)
- Cherakarottu Korula Jacob (1945–1947)

CSI Bishops in Central Travancore/Madhya Kerala

- C.K. Jacob (1947–1957)
- M.M. John (1958–1974)
  - T.S. Joseph, assistant bishop (consecrated 1 July 1967)
- T.S. Joseph (1974–1981) installed 27 December
- M.C. Mani (1981–1993) consecrated 8 February
- Sam Mathew (1993–2001) consecrated 1 September
- Thomas Samuel (2001–2011)
- Thomas K Oommen (2011–2020)
- Sabu Koshy Cherian (2021-Till date)

=== District Councils ===
The Diocese is divided into 12 District Councils. Each Council has a chairman presbyter.

Number	District Council	Pastorates	Outstation Pastorates
1	Adoor	Adoor, Kadampanad, Kollam, Kulathupuzha, S.Kunnida, Munroethuruthu, Puthuval, Thazhathumon, Thiruvananthapuram	
2	Elanthoor	Cheenerkara, Elanthoor, Kallely, Kidangannoor, Kuzhikkala, Mallassery, Nallanikunnu, Omalloor, Pathananthitta, Punnackad	
3	Ettumanoor	Ettumanoor, Kattampakal, Koothattukulam, Muttuchira, Njeezhoor, Ottiankurnnu, Piravam, Vaikom, Varikkamkkunnu, Velloor	
4	Kodukulanji	Kodukulanji, Angadickal, Chengannur, Karode, Kozhuvalloor, Kollakadavu, Cheruvalloor	
5	Kottayam	Arpookara, Ascension Kottayam, Cathedral Kottayam, Central Kumarakom, Erikadu, Kothala, Kumaranelloor, Machukadu, Manganam, Manarcadu, Muttambalam, Olassa, Pampady, Thiruvanchoor, Vadavathoor	
6	Kumplampoika	Ayroor, Chittar, Ennooramvayal (Vechoochira), Karikkattor, Kumplampoika, Neerettucavu, Pullikkallu Ranni, Vayalathala	
7	Mallappally	Ezhumattoor, Kaipatta, Keezhvaipur, Koothrappally, Kottanad, Mallappally, Mammood, Narakathani, Nedungadappally, Pariyaram	
8	Mavelikara	Mavelikara, Kallumala, Cherukunnam, Kattanam, Kappil, Bharanikkavu, South Puthuppally, Alumpedika, Njakkanal, Chamavila, Kayamkulam, Kanneetti, Mynagappally, Monkuzhy	
9	Mundakkayam	Mundakkayam, Thidanad, Vazhoor, Kanam, Edakunnam, Ponkunnam, Karinilam	
10	Pallom	Pallom, Panimattom, Velluthuruthy, Kavalam, Changanacherry, Kollad, Alappuzha, Karumadi, Njaliakuzhy, Mooledom, Thuruthy, Muhamma, Nalunnakkal, Poovanthuruthu	
11	Punnavely	Punnavely, Neelampara, Chelakompu, Mundathanam, Kangazha, East Meenadom, Mulekkunnu	
12	Thiruvalla	Tholassery, Kaviyoor, Perumthuruthy, Valanjavattom, Thalavady, Mundiappally, Kunnamthanam, Kuttoor, Poovathoor, Kumbanad, Warikkadu	

== Institutions under the diocese ==
Ashram

- Bethel Ashram, Thiruvalla

Printing Press

- C.M.S. Press, Kottayam (The first printing press in Kerala, established in 1821)

Weaving School

- CMS Weaving School, Tholassery, Thiruvalla

Colleges

- CMS College Kottayam (The first college in Kerala, established in 1817)
- Peet Memorial Training College Mavelikara
- Bishop Moore College Mavelikara
- Bishop Speechly College Pallom
- CSI College for Legal Studies, Ettumanoor
- Baker Women's College, Kottayam
- CSI College for Advanced Studies Punnakkad, Kozhencherry

Higher Secondary Schools

- Baker Memorial Girls Higher Secondary School, Kottayam
- Bishop Hodges Higher Secondary School Mavelikara
- CMS Higher Secondary School Mallapally
- CMS College Higher Secondary Kottayam
- CMS Higher Secondary Kuzhikala

High Schools

- CMS College Higher Secondary School Kottayam
- Baker Memorial Girls High School, Kottayam
- Bishop Hodges Higher Secondary School Mavelikara
- CMS Higher Secondary School Mallapally
- CMS Higher Secondary Kuzhikala
- Buchanan Girls High School Pallom
- CMS High School Mundakayam
- CMS High School Kattanam
- CMS High School Kumplampoika
- CMS High School Nedugadapally
- CMS High School Pallom
- CMS High School Punnavely
- CMS High School Olassa
- CMS High School Puthupally
- CMS High School Kanam
- CMS High School Thiruvalla
- CMS High School Thalavady
- CMS High School Mundiapally

Theological Education

- Bishop Mani Theological Institute Kottayam

Self Financing Schools

- Baker Vidyapith Kottayam
- Bishop Moore Vidyapith Mavelikara
- Bishop Moore English Medium Higher Secondary School Mavelikara
- Bishop Moore Vidyapith Cherthala
- Bishop Moore Vidyapith Kayamkulam
- Bishop Speechly Vidyapith Pallom
- Christ Church Vidyapith Kodukulanji
- Hawksworth Vidyapith Tholassery, Thiruvalla

Teacher Training Institutes

- B.I.T.T.I, Pallom
- C.N.I.T.T.I, Kottayam

Special Schools

- C.S.I VHSS for the Deaf, Thiruvalla
- C.S.I HSS for the Partially Hearing, Manakkala, Adoor

== Notable churches ==
Within Kerala

- Holy Trinity CSI Cathedral, Kottayam
- St.Joseph CSI Church, Poovathoor
- St.Peter's CSI Church, Puthuppally
- CSI Ascension Church Kottayam
- CSI Christ Church, Thiruvananthapuram
- St. Stephen's CSI Church Pariyaram Mallappally
- CSI Christ Church, Alappuzha
- CSI Christ Church, Mavelikkara
- CSI Christ Church, Kodukulanji
- St. Paul's CSI Church, Ranni
- St. Johns CSI Church Neelampara Karukachal
- Transfiguration CSI Church, Varikkad Thiruvalla
- Holy Trinity CSI Church Mundakayam
- St. Thomas CSI Church, Tholassery Thiruvalla
- St. Thomas CSI Church, Kumbanad Kumbanad
- St. Thomas CSI Church, Punnakadu
- St. Thomas CSI Church, Pattathanam, Kollam
- Holy Immanuel CSI Church, Mallappally
- CSI Christ Church, Kaviyoor
- St. Andrew's CSI Church, Kozhuvalloor
- CSI St. Andrew's Church Kumplampoika
- CSI St. Thomas' Church, Nedungadappally
- St. Thomas CSI Church, Thalavady
- CSI St. Stephen's Church, Puthuval
- CSI St. Mark's Church, Olassa
- CSI St. Stephen's Church, Mundiappally
- CSI St. John The Baptist church, Pallom
- CSI St.Paul's Church, Nalunnakkal
- Holy Trinity C.S.I Church, Alumpeedika

Outside India
Canada

- CSI Church, Toronto

UK

- Church Of South India (CSI) Malayalam Congregation, London
- ST Thomas CSI Church, Belfast
- CSI Congregation of Manchester, Midlands and Sheffield.

Kuwait

- St. Peter's CSI Church
- St. Paul’s CSI Church, Ahmadi

Qatar

- CSI St.Thomas Church -Malayalam Congregation, Doha - Qatar

UAE

- CSI Parish, Abu Dhabi
- CSI Parish, Dubai
- CSI Parish, Sharjah
- All Saints CSI Parish, Jebel Ali

USA

- Immanuel CSI Church, New Jersey
- CSI Emmanuel Congregation, Atlanta
- CSI Congregation of Great Lakes, Michigan
- Emmanuel CSI Church, Philadelphia
- CSI Congregation of Dallas
- CSI Congregation of Hudson Valley
- CSI Jubilee Memorial Church, New York
- Church of South India Malayalam Congregation of Greater New York

Australia

- Holy Trinity CSI Church, Brisbane

Ireland

- Holy Trinity CSI Congregation, Dublin

== Gallery ==
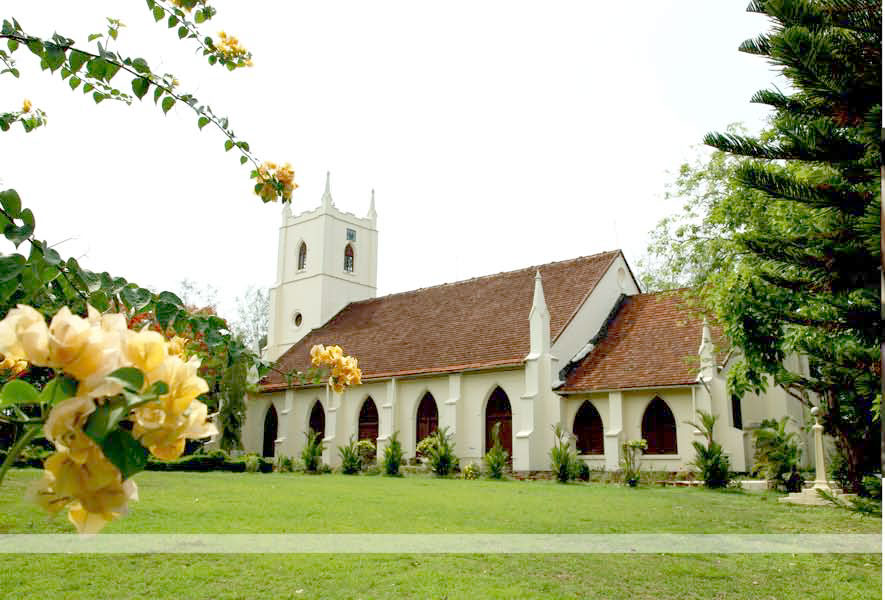
Holy Trinity CSI Cathedral, Kottayam

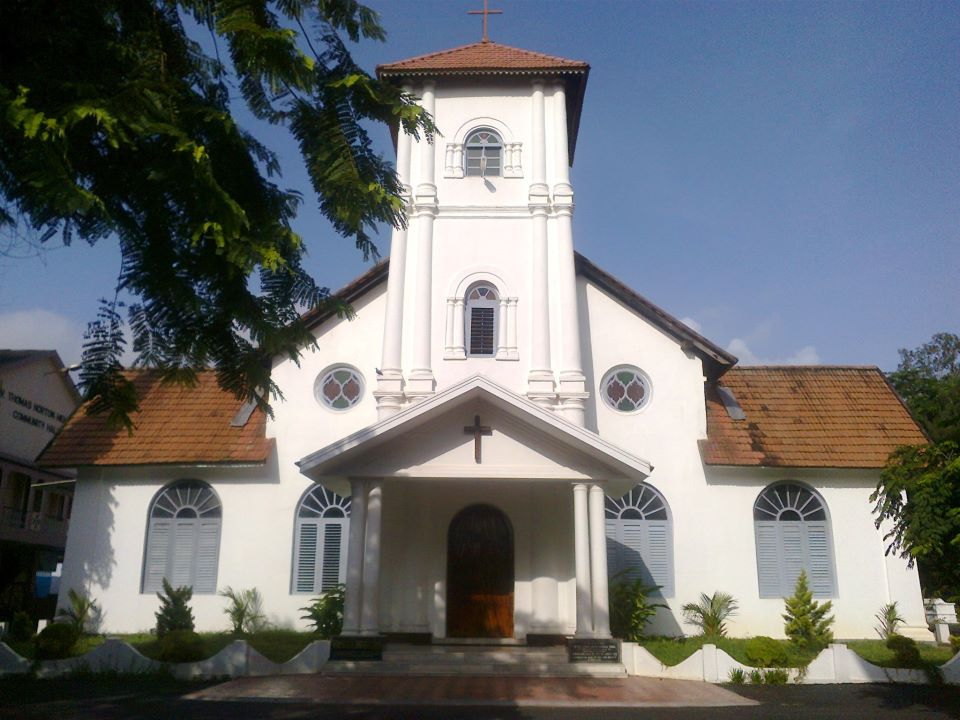
CSI Christ Church, Alappuzha

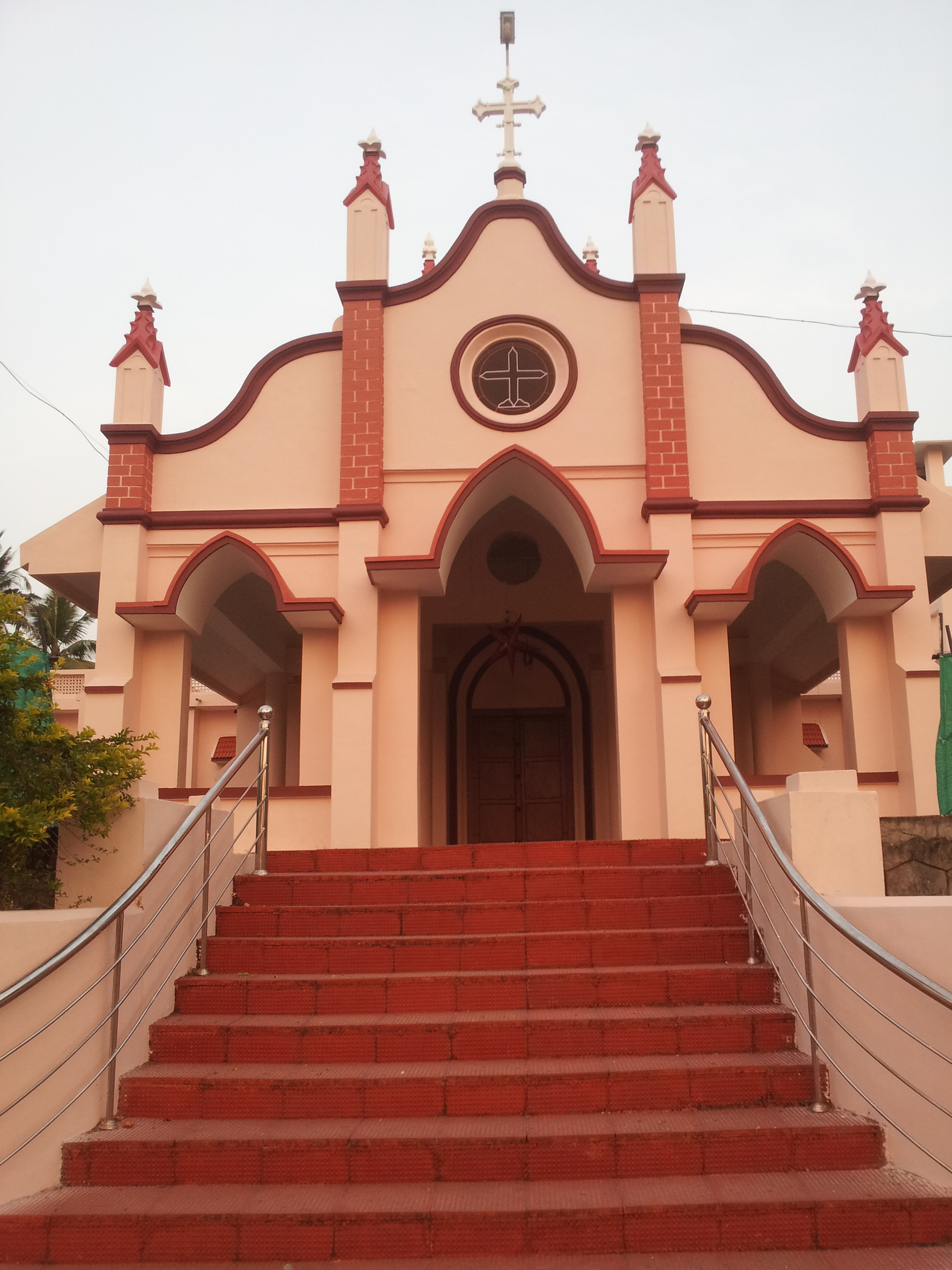
C.S.I Christ Church Kodukulanji

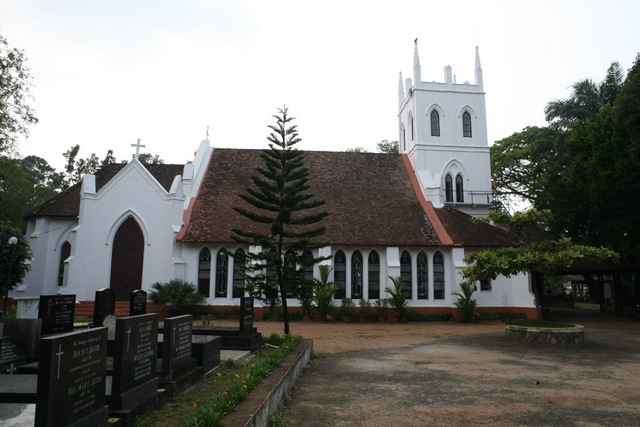
CSI Christ Church, Thiruvananthapuram

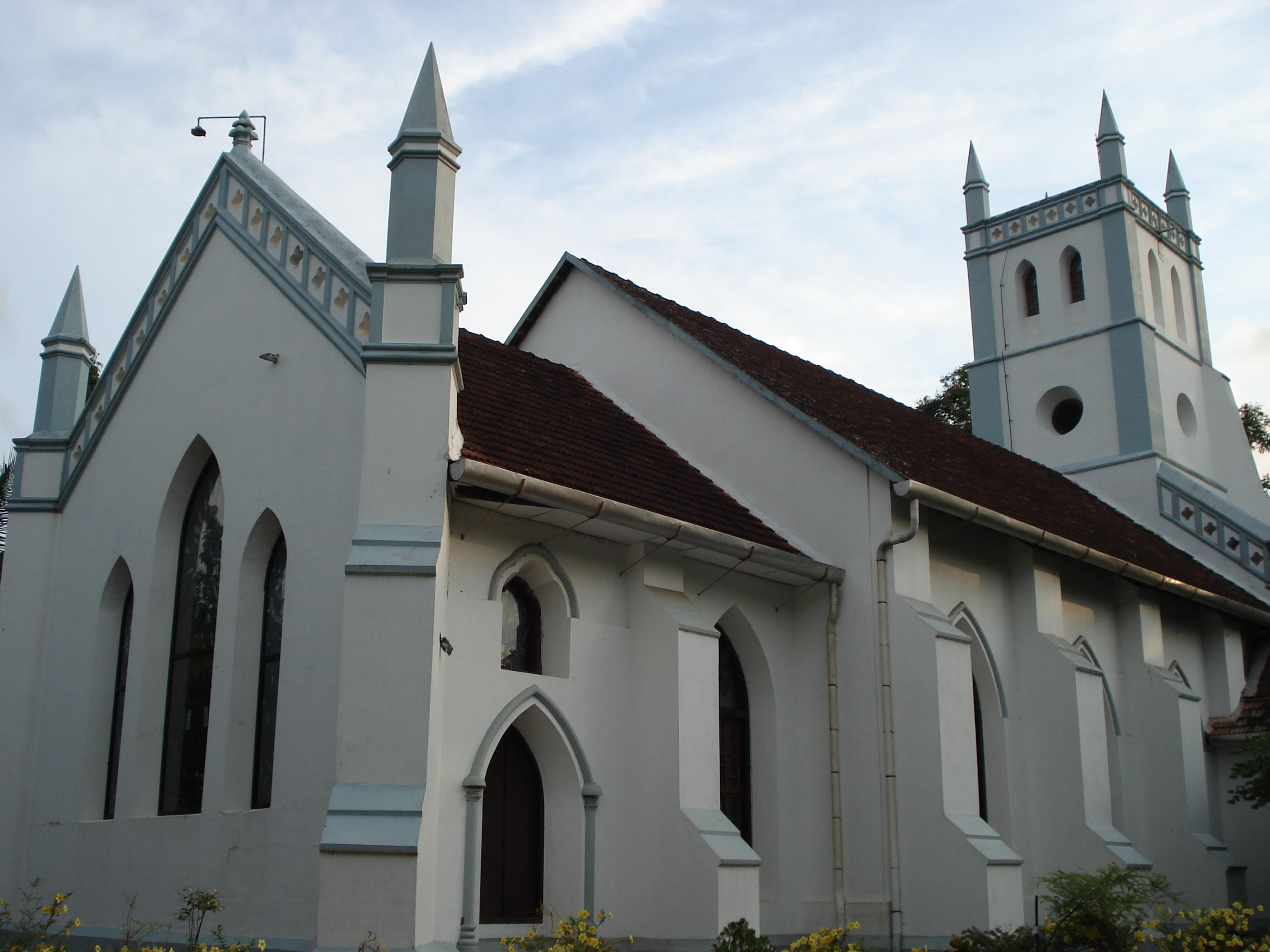
CSI Christ Church, Mavelikara

== See also ==
- Church of South India
- East Kerala Diocese
- South Kerala Diocese
- North Kerala Diocese
- Christianity in Kerala
