= Educational organisations in Mavelikkara =

Colleges and schools in Mavelikkara, Kerala, India

The following are some educational organisations in Mavelikkara, Kerala, India.

== Colleges ==
=== Art college ===
- Raja Ravi Varma College of Fine Arts, Mavelikkara

=== BEd college ===
- Peet Memorial Training College, Mavelikkara

=== Engineering colleges ===
- Archana College of Engineering, Nooranad.
- Sree Buddha College of Engineering.
- Sri Vellapally Natesan College Of Engineering, Pallickal.

=== General colleges ===
- Bishop Moore College, Kallumala, Mavelikkara
- College of Applied Sciences (IHRD), Mavelikkara
- Mar Ivanios College, Kallumala, Mavelikara
- Peet Memorial Training College, Mavelikkara

== Schools ==
- Govt. Higher Secondary School, Kunnam
- Govt. Boys' Higher Secondary School, Mavelikkara
- Govt. Girls' Higher Secondary School, Mavelikkara
- Govt. L.p &U.P. Kannamangalam South
- Vijnana Vilasini Higher Secondary School, Thamarakulam
- St John's High School, Mattom
- Sree Sai Public School, Kochalummoodu
- Bishop Moore Vidyapith, Kallumala, Mavelikkara
- Bishop Hodges Higher Secondary School, Mavelikkara
- Seventh Day Adventist English Medium High School, Mavelikkara
- Infant Jesus ISC School, Mavelikkara
- St. Mary's Cathedral Public School, Mavelikkara
- M.S.S High School, Thazhakara
- A.V.Sanskrit U.P. School, Thazhakara
- St John's English Medium School, Mattom
- Higher Secondary and Training School, Kaitha North, Chettikulangara
- Govt. V.H.S.S. Chunakara
- N.S.S.U.P.S. Chunakara
- Sree Buddha Central School, Pattoor, Padanilam
- Sree Narayana Central School, Cherukunnam, Mavelikkara
- St Mary's Cathedral Public School Puthiyacavu, Mavelikara
- Crossland Public School, Kunnam
- S.V.L.P School, Thazhakara.
- Vidhyadhiraja Vidya Peetom Central School, Ponnaramthottam
- Vidyadhiraja Vidyapeedom L.P. School
- Vijnana Santhayani Sanskrit High School, Koypallikaranma
- Thekekkara Government U.P. School
- TMVMHS, Vettiyar
- Pope Pius XI Higher Secondary School, Kattanam
- Govt. Higher Secondary School, Chettikulangara
- TTI School
- Mahatma Higher Secondary School for Boys, Chennithala
- Mahatma Higher Secondary School for Girls, Chennithala
- Jawahar Navodaya Vidyalaya, Chennithala.
- Cherupushpa Central School, Chunakkar
- St John's M.S.C.U.P.School, Kurathikad (Pallickal East)
- Amala L.P. School, Erezha
- Vathikulam L.P. School
- Mar Ivanious School, Kallumala
- CNPPM Vocational HS, Kattachira
- NSS High School, Kurathikad
- Govt. L.P. School, Kurathikad
- S.N. Central School, Cherukunnam.
- A.G.R.M.H.S.S, Vallikunnam
- Govt. U.P. School, Varenickal
- A.O.M.M. L.P. School
- Vikram Sarabhai I.T.E.
- St Mary's Central School, Vettiyar
- Erezha U.P. School, Chettikulangara
- Govt. U.P. School, Kandiyoor
- K.K.M. Govt. V.H.S.S, Elippakulam
- Govt L.P.S, Elippakulam
- Padanilam H.S.S., Nooranad
- Little Kingdom Junior School West Fort, Mavelikara
