= William Speechly (ice hockey) =

British-Canadian ice hockey player

- Born: 5 July 1906; Pilot Mound, Manitoba, Canada
- Died: 13 July 1982 (aged 76); Winnipeg, Manitoba, Canada
- Education: University of Manitoba; Cambridge University; Harvard University
- Occupation: History teacher
- Relatives: Harry M. Speechly (father); John Speechly (grandfather)
Ice hockey career
- Position: Goaltender
- Played for: Cambridge University (1927-30)
- National team: Great Britain
- Military career
- Allegiance: Canada
- Branch: Army
- Rank: Lieutenant
- Unit: Royal Winnipeg Rifles
- Conflicts: World War II

William Grove Speechly (5 July 1906 – 13 July 1982) was a British-Canadian ice hockey player and teacher who competed for Great Britain in the 1928 Olympics.

== Biography ==
Speechly was born in Pilot Mound, Manitoba, into a family with notable accomplishments in both medicine and religion. His father, Harry Martindale Speechly, was a medic, while his grandfather, John Speechly, held the distinguished position of being the first Anglican Bishop of Travancore and Cochin. Speechly pursued higher education at the University of Manitoba, where he completed his undergraduate degree in 1926. He traveled to the United Kingdom the following year to continue his studies at the St John's College, Cambridge. There, he immersed himself in the study of classics, spending three years deepening his knowledge of ancient literature, philosophy, and history.

While studying at Cambridge, Speechly served as captain of the Cambridge University Ice Hockey Club and earned a blue. During this period, he was also selected to play as goaltender for the Great Britain men's national ice hockey team. He participated in the 1928 Winter Olympics, where the British team placed fourth, and he appeared in three games. Additionally, he played in one game at the 1930 World Ice Hockey Championships.

After finishing his studies at Cambridge, he continued his education at Harvard University. He then returned to Canada, where he taught at the University of Manitoba, Trinity College School in Port Hope, Ontario, and both Luxton School and Gordon Bell High School in Winnipeg. During World War II, he served as a lieutenant with the Royal Winnipeg Rifles, taking part in combat from the Normandy landings through to the Battle of the Scheldt, where he sustained serious injuries at the Leopold Canal.
