= Bishop Moore Vidyapith =

Bishop Moore Vidyapith may refer to:

- Bishop Moore Vidyapith Mavelikkara, a Church of South India school in Mavelikkara, Kerala
- Bishop Moore Vidyapith, Kayamkulam, a Church of South India school in Kayamkulam, Kerala
- Bishop Moore Vidyapith Cherthala, a Church of South India school in Cherthala, Kerala

== See also ==
- Edward Moore (Bishop of Travancore and Cochin)
