= Sam Mathew =

Church of South India bishop

The Right Reverend Sam Mathew
- Bishop of Madhya Kerala Diocese
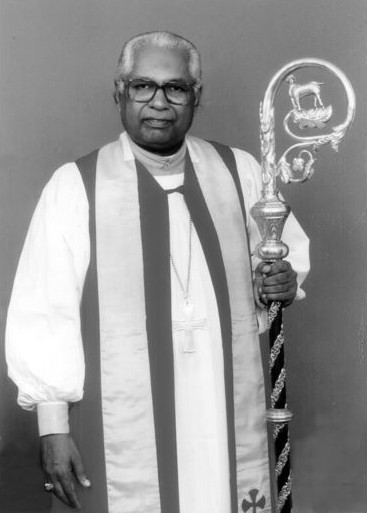
- Church: Church of South India
- Installed: 1 September 1993
- Term ended: 8 October 2001 (retired)
- Predecessor: M. C. Mani
- Successor: Thomas Samuel
- Other posts: Executive member of CSI Synod; Secretary of Nilakkal Ecumenical Trust; President of Kerala Council of Churches

Orders
- Ordination: 1965 (deacon), 1966 (priest)
- Consecration: 1 September 1993 by CSI Moderator Vasant P. Dandin; Dy. Moderator Jason Dharmaraj; Mar Thoma bishop Zacharias Theophilus

Personal details
- Born: 8 October 1936 Kodukulanji, Alappuzha district
- Died: 16 April 2016 (aged 79) Kottayam, Kerala
- Buried: CSI Holy Trinity Cathedral, Kottayam
- Denomination: United Protestant (Anglican Communion)
- Spouse: Kunjamma Vettasseril
- Children: Christy, Santhi & Annie
- Education: N. S. S. College, Pandalam; Bishop's College, Calcutta

Sam Mathew (8 October 1936 – 16 April 2016) was the bishop of the Madhya Kerala Diocese of the Church of South India (CSI) from 1993 to 2001. The CSI is a United Protestant church that is part of the Anglican Communion.

== Early life and education ==
Mathew was born the son of V. M. Mathai and Mariamma to the Anglican Syrian Christian family of Valiathottathil in Kodukulanji. He graduated from N. S. S. College, Pandalam. Afterwards, he earned the Bachelor of Divinity degree from Bishop's College, Calcutta.

== Ordinations ==
Sam Mathew was ordained as a deacon on 6 June 1965 in Alappuzha. He was ordained as a presbyter on 1 April 1966 in Puthuppally. On 1 September 1993, he was consecrated as the bishop of the Madhya Kerala Diocese of the Church of South India, at the CSI Holy Trinity cathedral, in Kottayam. The then CSI Moderator Vasant P. Dandin, Dy. Moderator Jason Dharmaraj, Mar Thoma bishop Zacharias Theophilus and others, performed the consecration. Sam Mathew served as the diocesan bishop for eight years, until his retirement on 8 October 2001.

== Public life ==
Bishop Sam Mathew was an executive member of the CSI Synod, as well as the chief editor of the Njananikshepam magazine. A torchbearer of ecumenism, he was the secretary of the Nilakkal Ecumenical Trust. He also served as the president of the Kerala Council of Churches for six years. He was a champion of the temperance movement. He was a campaigner for the environmental movement too. In recognition of Mathew's pastoral ministry, ecumenical leadership and missionary zeal, the California-based Vision International University conferred on him an honorary Doctor of Divinity degree on 3 September 1995.

== Family ==
Mathew married Kunjamma of the Vettasseril family of Keezhuvaipur. They had three children. Santhi and Annie are their daughters, and Christy is their son.

== Death and burial ==
After a period of sickness, Sam Mathew died on 16 April 2016 at the age of 79. The funeral took place at the CSI Holy Trinity Cathedral, Kottayam on 20 April 2016. Rt. Rev. Dr. Thomas K. Oommen, the then Dy. Moderator of the Church of South India led the service. Bishops of other churches like Zacharias Mar Polycarpos and Thomas Mar Timotheos participated in the service. Bishop Thomas K. Oommen read out the condolence message sent by Justin Welby, the Archbishop of Canterbury. Bishop Mathew was buried in a specially prepared tomb in the cathedral's premises. Thousands of mourners took part in the funeral procession and rites.

== See also ==
- Christianity in Kerala
- Saint Thomas Christians

Religious titles
Preceded by M. C. Mani	Bishop - in - Madhya Kerala Diocese; Church of South India; 1993–2001	Succeeded by Thomas Samuel
