= Bishop Moore College =

Aided college in Kerala, India

Coordinates: 9.2411°N 76.5557°E

Bishop Moore College [BMC]
- Kallumala, Mavelikara
- Other name: BMC
- Motto: The Truth Shall Make You Free
- Type: Government Aided
- Established: 1964; 62 years ago
- Parent institution: Church of South India
- Accreditation: NAAC (A Plus grade)
- Academic affiliations: Kerala University
- Principal: Dr. Ranjith Mathew Abraham
- Location: Mavelikkara, Kerala, India
- Website: bishopmoorecollege.ac.in

Bishop Moore College is an aided college in Mavelikkara, Alappuzha, Kerala, India, affiliated with the University of Kerala. The college is ranked 62nd among colleges in India by the National Institutional Ranking Framework (NIRF) in 2024. It was ranked 58 in NIRF 2022, 89 in NIRF 2021, 76 in NIRF 2020, in the rank band 101–150 in NIRF (National Institutional Ranking Framework) 2019, and ranked 92 in NIRF 2018. The college was accredited by NAAC with an "A" Grade in 2017 (Third Cycle of Accreditation). The college is managed by the Madhya Kerala Diocese of the Church of South India, and offers 11 undergraduate programs, five postgraduate programs, and two research programs. It is located at Kallumala, Mavelikara. The current principal of the college is Dr. Ranjith Mathew Abraham.

== History ==
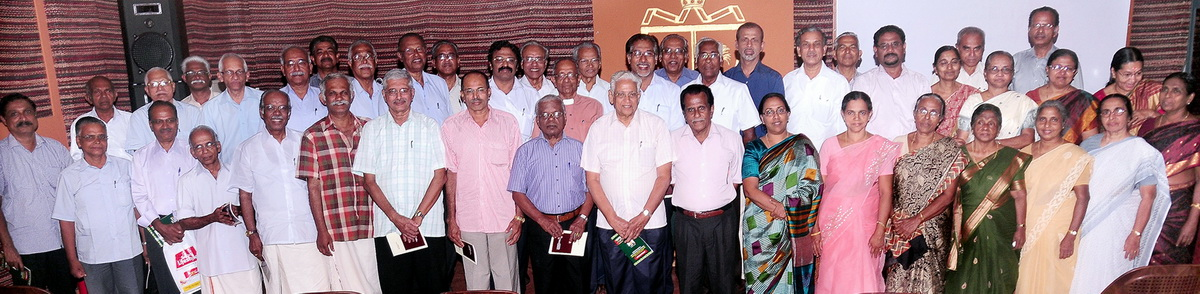
group photo of the retired staff

In 1964, the Kerala Government announced the need to start more junior colleges in the state. In response, Bishop Rt. Rev. M.M. John of the CSI Madhya Kerala Diocese made the decision to establish the college, renaming it in honor of the late Edward Moore, the fourth Anglican Bishop of Travancore and Cochin of the Church Missionary Society. In 1964, the college began operations as a Junior College offering a two-year-long Pre-Degree course for the University of Kerala. The founding Principal was Rev. K C Mathew.

In 1968, the University of Kerala sanctioned the provision of undergraduate courses. The first postgraduate course started in 1982. After the de-linking of Pre-Degree courses from the university education system in 2000, the college now offers ten undergraduate and three postgraduate programs.

Post-graduate classes started in the Department of Physics in 1983. The center for Nonlinear studies started in 2000. The University of Kerala approved the Department of Physics as a research department in 2013.

== Courses ==
Degree Courses

- B.A English Language and Literature
- B.A Malayalam
- B.A Economics
- B.Sc Mathematics
- B.Sc Physics
- B.Sc Chemistry
- B.Sc Zoology
- B.Sc Biotechnology
- Bachelor of Commerce (B.Com.Finance and B.Com.Computer Application )

Post Graduate Courses

- M.Sc Physics
- M.Sc Analytical Chemistry
- M.A English
- M.A Economics
- M.Sc Botany
- M.A Behavioural Economics and Data Science (New Generation Course)

Research Departments

1. Department of Physics

Theoretical Physics- Nonlinear dynamics, Quantum Computations, Nanomaterials, Spectroscopy,

Research Guides Dr. Thomas Kuruvilla, Dr. D Sajan

2. Department of Chemistry

Spectroscopy

== Notable alumni ==
- Saji Cherian, Minister of Fisheries, Culture and Kerala State Film Development Corporation
- Justice CT.Ravikumar, Judge, Supreme Court of India
- M. S. Arun Kumar, MLA
- Pramod Narayanan, MLA
- M Murali, ex-MLA
- Dr. Valson Thampu, an academic and a social thinker of national repute. Former principal, St. Stephen's College, New Delhi.
- Adv. B Babu Prasad, ex-MLA
- Dr.B. Aburaj, Director, State Institute of Educational Technology (SIET) & State Institute of Educational Training & Management (SIEMAT), Kerala and Gen. Secretary, Indian Philosophical Society.

== Notable conferences and seminars ==
=== Refresher course in theoretical physics ===
Bishop Moore College on 7 – 19 December 2009 Sponsored by the Indian Academy of Sciences, Coordinator Dr. Thomas Kuruvilla, Department of Physics. Dr. Thomas Kuruvilla was the Principal of Bishop Moore College from 2012 to 2014. During his tenure, the Department of Physics was upgraded as a Research Department.

=== Molecular Spectroscopy of Advanced Materials and Biomolecules ===
IMSAB 2012 from 7 to 9 August 2012 International Conference in the Department of Physics Organised by Dr. D Sajan

=== National seminar-Inclusive Growth and Indian Economy - 20 Years of Liberation ===
A national seminar with the financial help of UGC was conducted in the Economics Department. The topic was on Inclusive Growth and Indian Economy - 20 Years of Liberation.
Kerala planning board member Sri C. P. John inaugurated the function. Eminent scholars and academicians from various parts of India have participated.

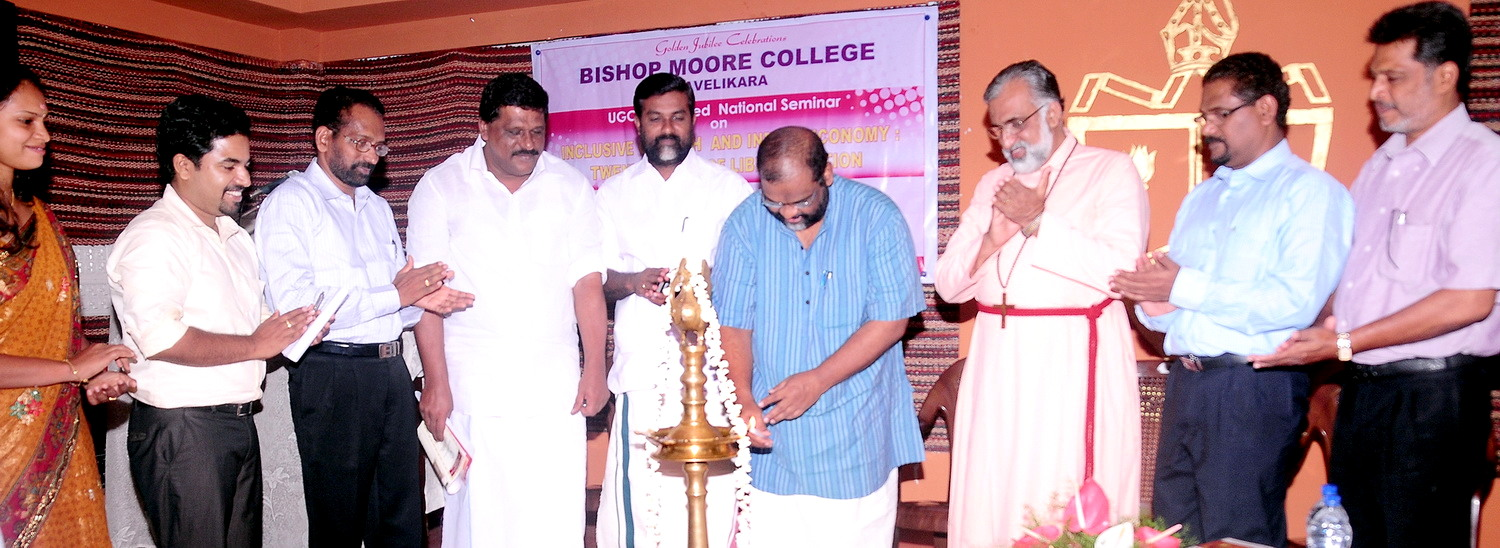
c.p.john inaugurates the function

=== International Conference on Marxism ===
Organised by post-graduation Department of English in 2019

== Principals and achievements ==
Rev. K.C. Mathew was the founding principal of Bishop Moore College. He served the college from 1964 to 1989. During this period, he played an important role in college's offering of postgraduate studies. Below is a list of principals that succeeded him after his retirement.

- Prof. M.K. Cherian (8 years)
- Prof. Mammen Varkey Varkey (5 years)
- Prof. Victor Sam (4 years)
- Prof. Koshy Ninan (4 years)
- Prof. Matthew Koshy (2 years)
- Prof. Kurien Thomas (1 year)
- Dr. Thomas Kuruvilla
- Dr. Leelamma George
- Dr. Sabu George
- Dr. Jacob Chandy

Dr. Thomas Kuruvilla was the principal of Bishop Moore College from 2012 to 2014. During his tenure, the college received four first ranks for degree examinations and one second rank for the PG examination of the University of Kerala, as well as conducting two international seminars in Physics.

1. All departments conducted national seminars.
2. The college won many prizes in sports, games, and university youth festivals.
3. Bishop Moore hosted the University Youth festival.
4. The college auditorium was renovated and made echo-proof.
5. A grant was received for the basketball and volleyball courts, as well as one for a generator.
6. The college was granted ten million rupees by UGC-FIST.
7. Five new classrooms and prayer centers were built.
8. The M.Sc. Course in Botany and B.Com. was equipped with a computer and applications began.
9. Bishop Moore had the best results in the University Examinations of 2013 and 2014.
10. The college girl's hostel was renovated.
11. Golden Jubilee celebrations were inaugurated by the Honorable Governor of Kerala in a grand function.

The current principal is Dr. Jacob Chandy from the Department of Zoology. He is an alumnus of Bishop Moore College.
