= Bernard Corfield =

Bernard Conyngham Corfield (1890 – 22 July 1965) was an Anglican bishop who served as Bishop of Travancore and Cochin from 1938 to 1944.

Corfield was born into an ecclesiastical family – the second son of Egerton Corfield, a Church Mission Society (CMS) priest in India, and grandson to two priests, F. C. Corfield and T. A. Anson, both of Derbyshire – and educated at St. Lawrence College, Ramsgate and Jesus College, Cambridge. After World War I service as a temporary Lieutenant in the RFA (during which he was mentioned in dispatches twice) he was ordained in 1920. He was Principal of the CMS School at Batala from then until 1928; and then held a similar post at Dera Ismail Khan until 1935. Returning to England he was Vicar of Christ Church, South Nutfield until 1938 when he was appointed to the episcopate. He was consecrated a bishop on 18 October 1938, at Madras' cathedral. Resigning his see in 1944 he became Rector of Stratfield Saye. In 1950 he was appointed Rector of St Lawrence Church, Winchester. In 1962 he was appointed the Chaplain of St John's Hospital, Winchester, and died in post on 22 July 1965.

Church of England titles
Preceded by Edward Moore	Bishop of Travancore and Cochin; 1938–1944	Succeeded by Cherakarottu Korula Jacob
