= Edward Moore (scholar) =

English scholar

Titlepage of the edition of Dante's works

Edward Moore, FBA (1835–1916) was an English scholar who specialized in Dante Alighieri. He was Principal of St Edmund Hall, Oxford from 1864 to 1903.

== Biography ==
Moore was born at Cardiff, the son of John Moore, a doctor of medicine. He was educated at Bromsgrove Grammar School and at Pembroke College, Oxford, where he received recognition.

He was elected Fellow of Queen's College, Oxford in 1858, subsequently working as tutor there, and was ordained deacon in 1859, then priest in 1861.

In 1864 he was nominated by the college to become the Principal of St Edmund Hall, Oxford. The appointment carried with it the rectory of Gatcombe, Isle of Wight. He stepped down as principal in 1903.

He was elected an honorary fellow of Pembroke College, Oxford in 1899, and of Queen's college in 1902, and received the honorary degree D.Litt. from the University of Dublin. In January 1903 he was announced as a canon of Canterbury Cathedral, and he was installed there on 26 January 1903. He was a Doctor of Divinity (DD).

Right Rev. Edward Moore (1870–1944), who was Anglican Bishop of Travancore and Cochin 1925–37, was his eldest son.

== Published works ==
- Aristotle's Ethics, books i-iv (5th edition, 1896)
- Aristotle's Poetics, with Notes (1875)
- Time References in the Divine Commedia (1887), translated and published at Florence in 1900 with the title Gli accenni al tempo nella Divina Commedia; Textual Criticism of the Divina Commedia
- Dante and his Early Biographers (1890)
- Tutte le opere di Dante Alighieri, the "Oxford Dante".
- Studies in Dante. First Series. Scripture and Classical Authors in Dante (Oxford, 1896)
- Studies in Dante. Second Series. Miscellaneous Essays (Oxford, 1899)
- Studies in Dante. Third Series. Miscellaneous Essays (Oxford, 1903)
- Studies in Dante. Fourth Series. Textual Criticism of the Convivio and Miscellaneous Essays (Oxford, 1917)
