= Hope Gill =

Charles Hope Gill was Bishop of Travancore and Cochin from 1905 to 1924.

Gill was born into an ecclesiastical family on 11 February 1861 and educated at St Edmund's School in Canterbury, King William's College on the Isle of Man and Queens' College, Cambridge. He was ordained in 1865 and began his career as a curate at St Peter's, Tynemouth. Later he was a CMS Missionary at Shikarpur and then Jabalpur. From 1898 until his consecration to the episcopate he was its Secretary in India.

He was consecrated a bishop on 18 October 1905 by Randall Davidson, Archbishop of Canterbury, at Westminster Abbey; to serve as the third diocesan Bishop of Travancore & Cochin. On his return to Europe he was Vicar of Gerrard's Cross and then British Chaplain at Hyères. He died on 29 June 1946.

Church of England titles
Preceded by Edward Noel Hodges	Bishop of Travancore and Cochin; 1905–1924	Succeeded by Edward Moore
