= John Speechly =

British bishop (1836–1898)

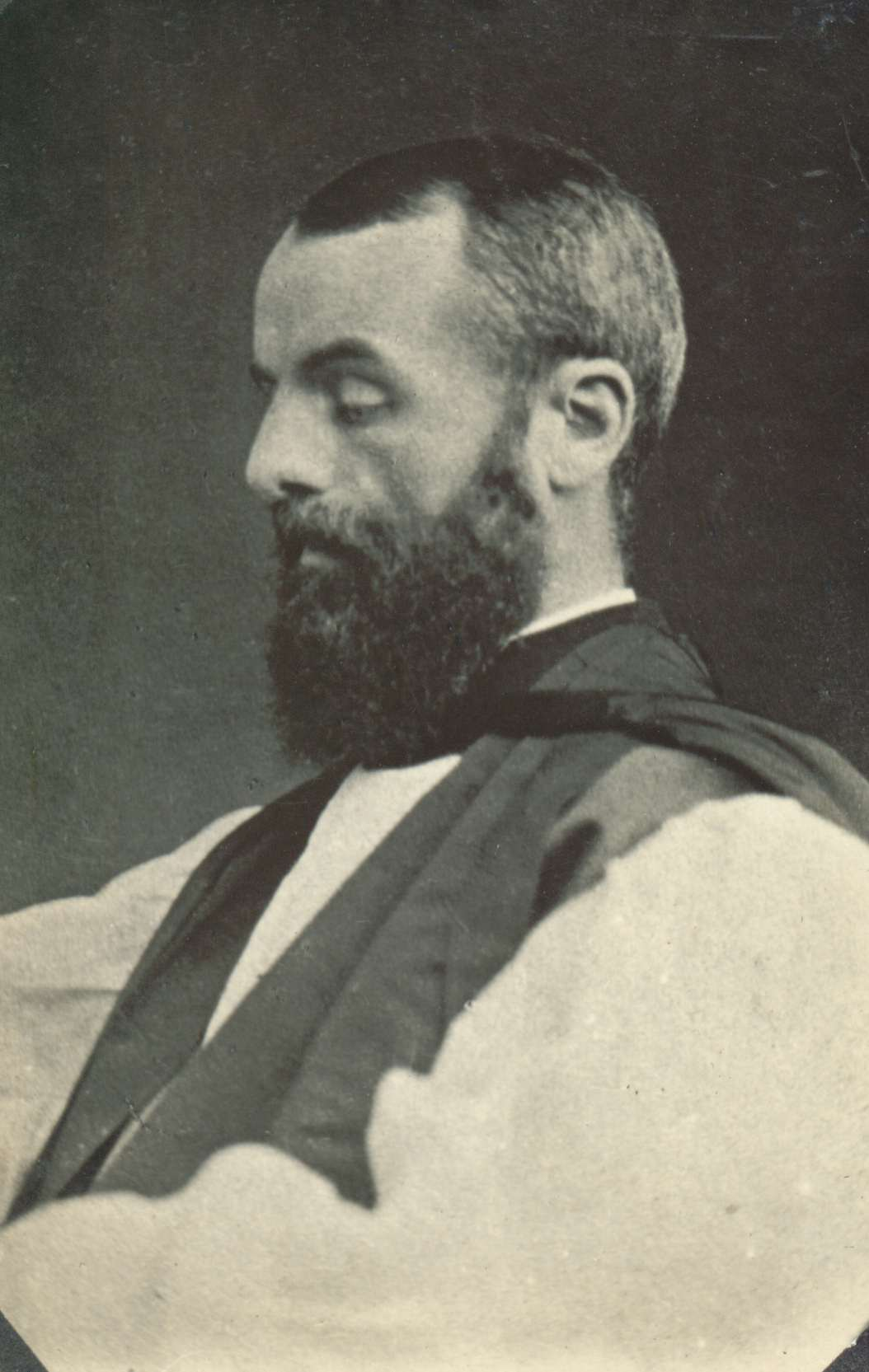
John Martindale Speechly

John Martindale Speechly (13 November 1836 – 22 January 1898) was the first Bishop of Travancore and Cochin.

Speechly was born on 13 November 1836 in Whittlesey, Cambridgeshire, the son of Thomas Kelfull Speechly and Sarah, née Bellars. He was educated at Oundle School and St John's College, Cambridge, and ordained in 1860 to a curacy in Peterborough. In 1862 he went to India as a Church Missionary Society missionary, and was stationed at Kunnamkulam until 1863 when he became Principal of the Cambridge Nicholson Institute (diocesan College), Cottayam (Kottayam) a post he held until 1869, and again from 1873 to 1876. He was curate of Hatford, Berkshire 1871–2, of St Mark's, Cambridge 1876–7, and of Horringer, Suffolk 1878.

When the See of Travancore and Cochin was erected under the Jerusalem Bishopric Act in 1879, Speechly was consecrated a bishop, by Archibald Campbell Tait, Archbishop of Canterbury, on 25 July at St Paul's Cathedral; he returned to Kottayam on 27 January 1880 and served as the first Bishop of Travancore and Cochin. After returning to England in 1888–1889, he was unable to return to India and resigned his See; he was later Bishop Commissary Diocese of Truro from 1889 to 1891 in the absence of the bishop, George Howard Wilkinson; then Vicar of Faversham from 1892 until his death on 22 January 1898. He is buried at Whittlesey Cemetery.

== Family ==
Speechly married Mary Gray Grove (1835 Bolton, Lancashire – 1913 Richmond, Surrey), daughter of Major Henry Jones Grove and Mary Anne Sinclair, in Trivandrum, India on 6 January 1863. They had 4 daughters and 4 sons:

1. Alice Mary Speechly, born 1 April 1864 Trivandrum, India, who married 25 July 1904 Rev. David Ewart Johnstone at St Philip's Church, Kensington.
2. Bessie Sinclair Speechly, born 31 August 1865 Cottayam, India, who married 1889 Franklin Frank Ranger in Croydon and died 18 March 1949 Honiton, Devon.
3. Harry Martindale Speechly, born 1867 Cochin, India, who married 30 July 1895 Mary Barrett in Wirral, and died 17 March 1951 Winnipeg
4. Katharine Emily Speechly, born 28 October 1868 Cottayam, India, who married 18 January 1913 to Randolph Henry Wylde Curtis, and died 1948 Kensington.
5. John Montgomery Speechly, born 28 April 1870 Ipswich, Suffolk, who married about 1923 Anne Bell Saunders and died 12 November 1953 Spiritwood, Saskatchewan.
6. Andrew Leslie Grove Speechly, born 1872 Cambridge, who married firstly 1901 Angela Alice Brockell and secondly 1945 Gladys E. Bell, died 28 December 1949 Bromley
7. Hilda Etheldreda Speechly, born 1877 Cambridge, married 1908 Charles Henry Wharton, died 26 September 1949 Honiton, Devon.
8. Clive Aveling Speechly, born 1879

John Martindale Speechly died 22 January 1898 at Faversham, Kent.

Church of England titles
Preceded by Inaugural appointment	Bishop of Travancore and Cochin; 1879–1889	Succeeded by Edward Noel Hodges
