= Njananikshepam =

Malayalam-language magazine

Njananikshepam ('The Treasury of Knowledge')
- October 2014 cover page
- Chief editor: Rev. Viju Varkey
- Categories: Magazine
- Frequency: Monthly
- Publisher: Diocese of Madhya Kerala
- Founder: Archdeacon K. Koshy and Reverend George Mathan
- Founded: 1848
- First issue: November 1848
- Country: India
- Based in: Kottayam
- Language: Malayalam

Njananikshepam (Malayalam: ജ്ഞാനനിക്ഷേപം) is one of the earliest printed magazines in the Malayalam language. The magazine is now published by the Madhya Kerala Diocese of Church of South India.

== History ==
Njananikshepam is one of the earliest publications from Kerala state. The magazine began publishing in 1848. Initially, the magazine had eight pages and was printed at the C.M.S. Press, Kottayam. Archdeacon K. Koshy and the Reverend George Mathan were behind the publication.

== Content ==
The magazine publishes various articles related to Christian theology, the history of the Church of South India and news about Madhya Kerala Diocese. Every edition includes a letter from the current bishop of the diocese, describing its activities. News articles from church organizations, i.e. women's fellowship, lay fellowship, youth movement, Bethel Ashram, choristers association, and the educational board are published every month. A news column named "Loka Jalakam", detailing major world news events, is also published every month.

== See also ==
- Media in Kerala
