= Colonial Clergy Act 1874 =

Act of the Parliament of the United Kingdom

Colonial Clergy Act 1874 (Note: Section 1.)
- Act of Parliament
- Parliament of the United Kingdom
- Long title: An Act respecting Colonial and certain other Clergy.
- Citation: 37 & 38 Vict. c. 77
- Territorial extent: United Kingdom (Note: Section 14 provides that "England" includes the Isle of Man and the Channel Islands.)

Dates
- Royal assent: 7 August 1874
- Commencement: 7 August 1874 (Note: The Acts of Parliament (Commencement) Act 1793.)
Other legislation
Amends	See § Repealed enactments
Repeals/revokes	See § Repealed enactments
Amended by	Overseas and Other Clergy (Ministry and Ordination) Measure 1967

Status: Partially repealed

Text of statute as originally enacted

Revised text of statute as amended

Text of the Colonial Clergy Act 1874 as in force today (including any amendments) within the United Kingdom, from legislation.gov.uk.

The Colonial Clergy Act 1874 (37 & 38 Vict. c. 77) is an act of the Parliament of the United Kingdom that restricted clergy ordained by bishops outside the Church of England, the Church of Ireland, or the Protestant Episcopal Church in Scotland from officiating, or being admitted to preferment, in England without permission, and repealed several earlier enactments concerning the ordination of colonial and other clergy.

== Provisions ==
=== Repealed enactments ===
Section 2 of the act repealed 5 enactments, listed in schedule A to the act.

Citation	Short title	Description	Extent of repeal
24 Geo. 3. Sess. 2. c. 35	Ordination of Aliens Act 1784	An Act to empower the Bishop of London for the time being, or any other bishop to be by him appointed, to admit to the order of deacon or priest persons being subjects or citizens of countries out of His Majesty's dominions, without requiring them to take the oath of allegiance as appointed by law.	Section 2.
26 Geo. 3. c. 84	Consecration of Bishops Abroad Act 1786	An Act to empower the Archbishop of Canterbury or the Archbishop of York for the time being to consecrate to the office of a bishop persons being subjects or citizens of countries out of His Majesty's dominions.	So far as the same is in force in any part of Her Majesty's dominions out of the United Kingdom.
59 Geo. 3. c. 60	Ordinations for Colonies Act 1819	An Act to permit the Archbishops of Canterbury and York and the Bishop of London for the time being to admit persons into holy orders specially for the colonies.	Sections 2, 3, 4, and 5.
3 & 4 Vict. c. 33	Scottish Episcopal and other Clergy Act 1840	An Act to make certain provisions and regulations in respect to the exercise within England and Ireland of their office by the bishops and clergy of the Protestant Episcopal Church in Scotland, and also to extend such provisions and regulations to the bishops and clergy of the Protestant Episcopal Church in the United States of America, and also to make further regulations in respect to bishops and clergy other than those of the United Church of England and Ireland.	The whole act.
5 Vict. c. 6	Bishops in Foreign Countries Act 1841	An Act to amend an Act made in the twenty-sixth year of the reign of His Majesty King George the Third, intituled "An Act to empower the Archbishop of Canterbury or the Archbishop of York for the time being to consecrate to the office of a bishop persons being subjects or citizens of countries out of His Majesty's dominions."	Section 4.

== Subsequent developments ==
The whole act, except section 12, was repealed by section 7(1) of the Overseas and Other Clergy (Ministry and Ordination) Measure 1967 (No. 3), which came into force on 14 July 1967. Section 12, which allows the archbishop of Canterbury or York to dispense with the oath of due obedience when consecrating a bishop to exercise episcopal functions outside England, remains in force.
