= Harry Martindale Speechly =

Canadian medical doctor

Harry Martindale Speechly (1 November 1866 – 17 March 1951) was a Canadian medical doctor.

Speechly was the son of John Martindale Speechly, the first Bishop of Travancore and Cochin, India, and Mary Gray née Grove. He was born in Cochin on 1 November 1866.

He was educated at Monkton Combe School and The Perse School and St John's College, Cambridge. He began his medical studies at London Hospital in 1884, graduating with the degrees of M.R.C.S. Eng. and L.R.C.P.Lon.

Speechly began his medical career as a physician with England's North Sea Fishing Fleet, followed by an appointment as house surgeon, house physician, and casualty officer at the London Hospital. In 1893, he resigned to become the medical officer at Mostyn Hall preparatory school in Parkgate, Cheshire and practiced medicine in Parkgate until emigrating to Canada in 1901. He settled at Pilot Mound, Manitoba, where he continued his medical practice and was Coroner from 1906 to 1916. During the First World War he served from 1916 to 1919 as a medical officer at the Voluntary Aid Detachment (VAD) Hospital Fleet, Hampshire England. He was awarded the Red Cross Medal for meritorious service.

He returned to Canada in 1919 and set up a medical practice in Winnipeg. He was appointed Provincial Coroner in 1929, a position he held until his retirement in 1942. From 1942 to 1945 he was an assistant medical officer at King Edward Hospital in Winnipeg.

Speechly was known for his ongoing battle against mosquitos. In 1927 he asked the Natural History Society to appoint an expert committee to examine the feasibility of a mosquito control campaign for Greater Winnipeg. From then, almost to his death, he served permanently as president and chairman of the Greater Winnipeg Anti-Mosquito Campaign. In 1950 he was elected the first regional Director from Canada of the American Mosquito Control Association.

Other posts Speechly held were vice-president of the Manitoba Medical Association, and Secretary of the Pilot Mound Board of Trade. He was President of the Brotherhood of St. Andrew in Canada in 1922, President of the Winnipeg Boy Scouts Association, and a member of the Canadian Club of Winnipeg, the Thistle Curling Club, and the Assiniboine Lawn Bowling Club. Speechly was the first president of the Manitoba Horticultural and Forestry Association in 1911 and helped found the Natural History Society of Manitoba in 1920. In 1943 he was conferred the degree of honorary Doctorate of Laws by the University of Manitoba.

Speechly died in Winnipeg on 17 March 1951, and was buried in Brookside Cemetery.

== Family ==
Speechly married Mary Barrett, the eldest daughter of the Rev William Ferguson Barrett on 30 July 1895 in Neston, Wirral. His wife, Mary Barrett Speechly, was a well-known advocate for women's rights in Manitoba for over sixty years and founded the Winnipeg Birth Control Society, to provide poverty-stricken women with access to contraceptive information. They had a daughter and two sons:

- Margaret Mary Speechly, born 21 May 1896 at Parkgate, Cheshire, married Edmund John Stansfield 14 November 1925 in Winnipeg and died 30 June 1990 in Winnipeg.
- William Grove Speechly, was born on 5 July 1906 at Pilot Mound, Manitoba and died on 13 July 1982 in Winnipeg.
- Leslie Barrett Speechly, born 13 April 1909 at Pilot Mound, Manitoba, married Agnes Gwendoline Smith and died 14 May 1997.
