= C. T. Ravikumar =

Indian judge (born 1960)

Chudalayil Thevan Ravikumar
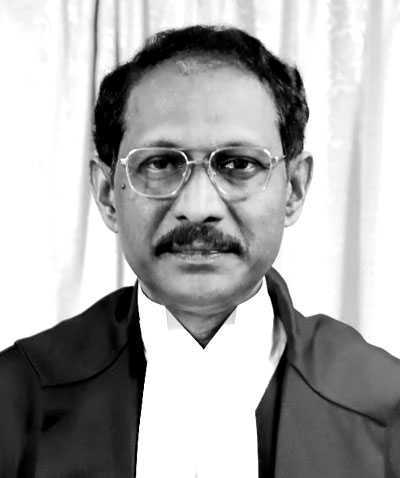

Judge of the Supreme Court of India
- In office 31 August 2021 – 5 January 2025
- Nominated by: N. V. Ramana
- Appointed by: Ram Nath Kovind

Judge of the Kerala High Court
- In office 5 January 2009 – 30 August 2021
- Nominated by: K. G. Balakrishnan
- Appointed by: Prathiba Patil

Personal details
- Born: 6 January 1960 (age 66) Thazhakara Mavelikara Alappuzha Kerala
- Spouse: Saira Ravikumar
- Relations: 3 brothers, 2 sisters C.D.Muralidharan C.D.Radhamani C.T.Rajan C.T.Sasikumar C.T.Jayakumari
- Parent(s): K.Thevan & Saraswathy
- Education: Government Law College, Calicut

Chudalayil Thevan Ravikumar (born 6 January 1960) (Malayalam: ചുടലയിൽ തേവൻ രവികുമാർ) is a former judge of the Supreme Court of India and previously of the Kerala High Court.

== Early life ==
Ravikumar was born on 5 January 1960 at Thazhakara small village near Mavelikara, Alappuzha District. He is the youngest son of Sri Thevan and Smt. Saraswathy. His father Sri K. O. Thevan was a bench clerk at the Changanassery magistrate court.

== Career ==
Ravikumar enrolled as an advocate on 12 July 1986. He was graduated in Zoology from Bishop Moore College, Mavelikkara. He obtained his Law Degree from Government Law College, Calicut. He started practice at Mavelikara court as junior of Adv. P.S. Vasudevan. In 1990 he shifted his practice to High court and joined in the chambers of former Advocate General M K Damodaran, a doyen of the bar. He later started independent practice in Civil, Criminal, Service and Labour matters at various courts of Ernakulam and Kerala High Court. He was then appointed to the post of Govt Pleader, Additional Govt Pleader and Special Govt Pleader(SC/ST) in Kerala High Court. He was appointed as Additional Judge of Kerala High Court on 5 January 2009 and made permanent on 15 December 2010.

Ravikumar served as the Executive Chairman, Kerala State Legal Services Authority, which provides free legal aid services to the weaker sections of the society and also organises Lok Adalats for amicable settlement of disputes. During his tenure at Kerala High Court as Senior Judge he was also served as the President of the Kerala Judicial Academy, President of Kerala State Mediation and Conciliation Centre. He also served as the Executive Chairman, Lakshadweep Legal Services Authority.

In 2014, Ravikumar created headlines when he refused to hear 50 petitions relating to renewal of licenses of 418 bars in different parts of the state filed by Bar Owners Association, saying that a lawyer connected with the case visited him at his residence to talk about the case.

A bench led by Ravikumar upheld the single bench direction for CBI investigation into the politically sensitive Periya double murder case. The division bench partly allowed the state's appeal by setting aside the Single Bench order to the extent it quashed the charge sheet filed by the special investigation team. The Division Bench of the Kerala High Court was of the opinion that a lot of prima facie evidence had been missed out due to the slackness and incomplete investigation of the Kerala Crime Branch that may possibly result in the miscarriage of justice.

Ravikumar highlighted the importance of speedy trial while allowing the splitting of trial against an accused in the SNC Lavlin case (Sidhartha Menon P vs. DySP Chennai). "Law long but life is short", his judgment commented about the convoluted processes of criminal trial. "Right to life means right to live with full human dignity, without humiliation and deprivation or degradation of any sort. There can be no doubt that the tag of 'accused' would deprive a man the right to live with full human dignity. The right to speedy trial is also a human right and no civilized society can deny the same to an accused. Furthermore, it should always be the concern of the society to see that a real culprit is given the punishment at the earliest and also to see that an accused is given the punishment at the earliest and also to see that an accused is given an early opportunity to clear the cloud of suspicion shrouded around him and to remove the tag of 'accused'. The said purpose in view that is founded on social interest could not be achieved if trial is unduly delayed as trial is the sole device to decide the guilt or innocence of an accused. Nobody can dispute the position that Courts have a duty to proceedcriminal cases with a reasonable pace", Ravikumar observed in the case. It is his Lordship’s focus on justice that has gotten him this far and will carry him way further.

Thereafter, in 2016, the bench of Ravikumar and Jyothindranath in the case of L. Mini & Ors vs Gireeshkumar & Anr, in a motor vehicle claims appeal having regard to the concept of a welfare state, made the government liable to compensate the deceased or the injured vehicle owner. The bench held that “Roads to ply the vehicles are provided and maintained by the Government. Under such a circumstance, there will be a welfare state liability for the Government which will partially eclipse the maxim volunti non fit injuria and fault liability theory.” It noted that the government can either shoulder it by itself or can fasten liability upon the authorised insurance company by statutorily making it liable over and above the liability of the insured for which an appropriate change in the Motor Vehicles Act was the need of the day.

In 2019, the pair of Ravikumar and VG Arun in the case of Kerala Public Service Commission v. Radha S. considered the case of disqualification of teaching candidates on the ground that they had not submitted their NET qualification certificates on time. It observed that the incomplete applications were due to technical glitches in the Public Service Commission’s website and not the fault of the candidates. The PSC had also decided to admit applications which was restricted to candidates in subjects which had not been interviewed for. The Court held this to be a “hostile discrimination” violating Article 14.

The bench of S. Manikumar, CK Abdul Rehim and Ravikumar in a suo moto case took note of the impact of national lockdown when it was first imposed. The bench held that the right of personal liberty guaranteed under Article 21 should not be infringed by arresting an accused except in matters where arrest in inevitable.

A Division Bench of Ravikumar and M. Purushothaman in March 2021 in a suo motu case concerning the Travancore Devaswom Board noted that the virtual queue system of the Kerala police was resulting in under-utilisation of permitted number of pilgrims at Sabrimala. Therefore the number of pilgrims was raised to 10,000.

== Supreme Court of India ==
Ravikumar was elevated as judge of Supreme Court of India on 26 August 2021 and took the oath on 31 August 2021. He was the fifth judge of the Kerala High Court to become a judge of the Supreme Court without occupying the position of chief justice of a high court. He was also the 15th person from the state of Kerala to become a supreme court judge.

== Personal life ==
Ravikumar is married to Smt. Saira Ravikumar. She is a practicing lawyer in Kerala High court and they have two daughters - Neethu and Neenu. Sri C. D. Muralidharan (Retd. School Teacher), Smt. C. D. Radhamani (KSEB senior superintendent), Sri C. T. Rajan (Retd. Chief Manager, State Bank of India), Sri C. T. Sasikumar (Retd. School Teacher), and Smt. C. T. Jayakumari (Thalayolaparambu) are his siblings.
