= Amelia Baker =

Educational missionary (1802–1888)

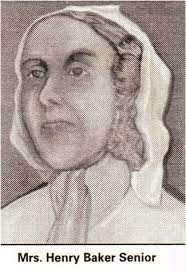

Amelia Dorothea Baker, Sr (1802–1888) was a religious educational missionary working in Kottayam, Kerala, India in the 19th century. She grew up in a missionary family and married fellow religious missionary Henry Baker. With the Church Missionary Society, Baker worked to for the education of women and girls of the community, founding of the first CMS girls' school in Travancore. Baker Memorial Girl's High School was the first school to implement uniforms to promote equality amongst students and in 1952 became the home of India's first Girl Guide troops.

== Early life ==
Born in 1802 in Thanjavur (Tanjore), India, Amelia Dorothea Baker belonged to a missionary family. Staying in South India her whole life, Baker grew up doing missionary work alongside her uncle J.C. Kohlhoffin. She married Henry Baker in 1818.

== Career ==
With her husband away for long stretches of time with CMS, Baker focused her missionary work locally. Locally referred to as Walia Madama (Great Lady), Baker worked closely with community members who came to her for advice on matters including medical, domestic, and personal. One local said "he [wished] all women were Christians, if they were to be like Mrs. Baker."

=== Girls' school ===
Alongside a fellow missionary wife, Mrs. Fenn, Baker established a small girls' school out of her bungalow. The year that Baker first started the school is given as 1819 or 1820.

Considered the first girls' school in the state it started small with about 12 girls, growing to 18 the following year. Baker ran the school under the motto "Love Never Faileth" with the goal of "educating a future nation" by empowering girls with "the strength of education". The school began as a day school but became boarding when Baker took in 6 of her students. Students lived as far as 100 miles from the school grounds which were located near the CMS built church. By its tenth year Baker's school boarded 42 young women. Government funding was used to subsidize the cost.

As was common in the pursuits of "Female education" of the time, Baker's school aimed to educate girls in both academic and lively pursuits. Girls were taught to read, speak English, sew, knit, spin, and mend clothes with the hope of providing them with the tools to successfully financially support themselves and their future families. The school also sought to make its students eligible wives for missionaries, their dowries often covered by the CMS.

Though the school was, and is, religiously affiliated it accepted students of all classes and creeds. Students were not required to distance themselves from any part of their culture and were often seen on campus wearing traditional Mekha motiram.

== Personal life ==
Together they had 11 children. Their son Henry Baker Jr served the CMS across India for 36 years. Their daughter Amelia Johnson (Baker) also stayed in Kottayam to run Baker Memorial Girl's High School. In 1840, she married the first missionary ordained in Kottayam, John Johnson.

== Death and legacy ==
Baker stayed in Kottayam till her death in 1888. She is buried there alongside her husband.

Baker's legacy continued in the Baker Memorial Girl's High School. In 1893 Amelia Johnson alongside her daughters took over the running of the girls' school. In honor of Baker's memory and work, the CMS created the Amelia Baker Memorial Fund whose profits went to the foundation of multiple girls schools. The first was opened in 1893 between Kottoyam and Pallam. The Kerala state board of education designated it an upper secondary school in 1894 the same year it was renamed 'Miss Bakers School' in memory of the past Miss Bakers. In 1904 it was upgraded into a high school and became officially state affiliated in 1952.

Baker's school was one of the first girls schools in India to implement uniform, with the goal of creating equity amongst its students. Additionally, the School was the first school in India to found a Girl Guides troop.

The school is currently designated a Higher Secondary School (as of 1998) and enrolls over 1400 young women. In 2014, a final branch of the school was designated in the Baker College for Women. The school celebrated its bicentennial anniversary in 2019 and is still regarded as "one of the best English schools in Travancore."കോട്ടയത്തെ ബേക്കർ jn അറിയപ്പെടുന്നത് അവരുടെ പേരിൽ ആണ് henry baker and amelia baker
