= Edward Moore (bishop of Travancore and Cochin) =

English bishop

Edward Alfred Livingstone Moore (13 November 1870 – 22 September 1944) was Bishop of Travancore and Cochin from 1925 to 1937.

Moore was born in Oxford into an ecclesiastical family. He was educated at Marlborough and Oriel College, Oxford and was ordained in 1895.

Moore began his career as a curate in Aston, became a CMS Missionary in southern India, Principal of the society's Divinity School in Madras, and progressed to become Chairman of its Tinnevelly operations until his elevation to the episcopate. Returning to England he was Vicar of Horspath from 1938 until his death on 22 September 1944.

Several schools in India are named after Moore including the Bishop Moore Vidyapith, Mavelikkara.

== Early life ==
Edward Alfred Livingstone Moore was the eldest son of Dr Edward Moore, the Principal of St Edmund Hall, Oxford. He was born in England in 1870.

Bishop Moore received his MA from the University of Oxford, and shortly after became a Missionary of the Church Missionary Society in India.

== Career ==
When he was 32 years old, he became the Principal of the CMS College, Kottayam. After a few years at Kottayam, he left the principal position. For the following 8 years, he was a Missionary in Tamil Nadu — he learned to speak Tamil and Malayalam. On 24 February 1925, he was consecrated a bishop by Randall Davidson, Archbishop of Canterbury, at Lambeth Palace Chapel, to serve as the fourth Bishop of Travancore & Cochin; he took charge of the Diocese at Kottayam in the same year. He was determined to end the caste system that was prevalent everywhere. He created history by ordaining two clergymen from the "backward classes". He established many community schools in different parts of the Diocese. The community school at Ranny was established as early as 1928 where the inmates trained in self-employment schemes.

Although he was a Missionary Bishop, when the poor approached him en masse to convert to Christianity to escape discrimination, he discouraged them. He was of the opinion that a person should be converted to Christian faith only from conviction. Mahatma Gandhi personally congratulated him for not allowing mass conversion.

At a time when medical facilities were not available to poor people in the coastal area, he introduced "mobile dispensaries" on boats so that medical help could be taken to the poor.

The concept of "ecumenism" among the Christian churches in Kerala traces to the common retreats and Eucharist arranged by him in 1932 for the Priests of both CMS (after Independence C.S.I) and Marthoma Churches.

Bishop Moore served the Diocese without salary or remuneration. Throughout his time in Kerala, he subsisted on help from his sister in England. He deposited the salary due to him into a special fund to support future Bishops.

He retired from service in 1937 and returned to England. Moore died on 22 September 1944.

== Notes ==
Church of England titles
Preceded by Charles Hope Gill	Bishop of Travancore and Cochin; 1925–1937	Succeeded by Bernard Conyngham Corfield
