= Niranam =

- Village
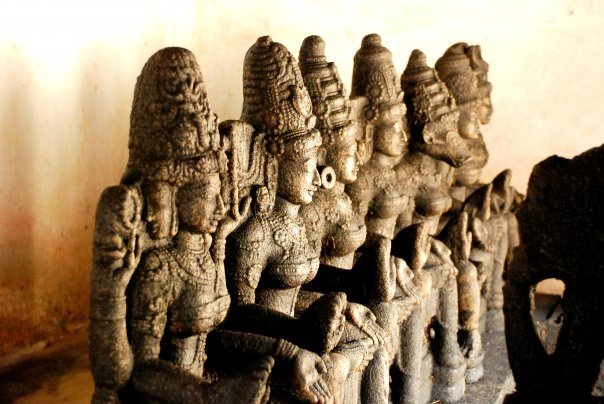
- Niranam Thrikka Paleswaram Temple Saptamathakal Statue
- Interactive map of Niranam
- Coordinates: 9°21′N 76°31′E
- Country: India
- State: Kerala
- District: Pathanamthitta

Population (2011)
  - Total: 10,770

Languages
  - Official: Malayalam, English
- Time zone: UTC+5:30 (IST)
- Postal Index Number: 689621
- Vehicle registration: KL-27 (Thiruvalla)

Niranam is a village in Thiruvalla, Kerala, India. It was a port in ancient Kerala, on the confluence of the Manimala and Pamba River. It is almost 7 km from Tiruvalla in Pathanamthitta District of Kerala, lies to the western part of Tiruvalla, identified as Upper Kuttanad region. It Is Part Of Thiruvalla Sub-District.Also Comes Under Thiruvalla Constituency.It is identified with Nelcynda in Periplus of the Erythraean Sea.

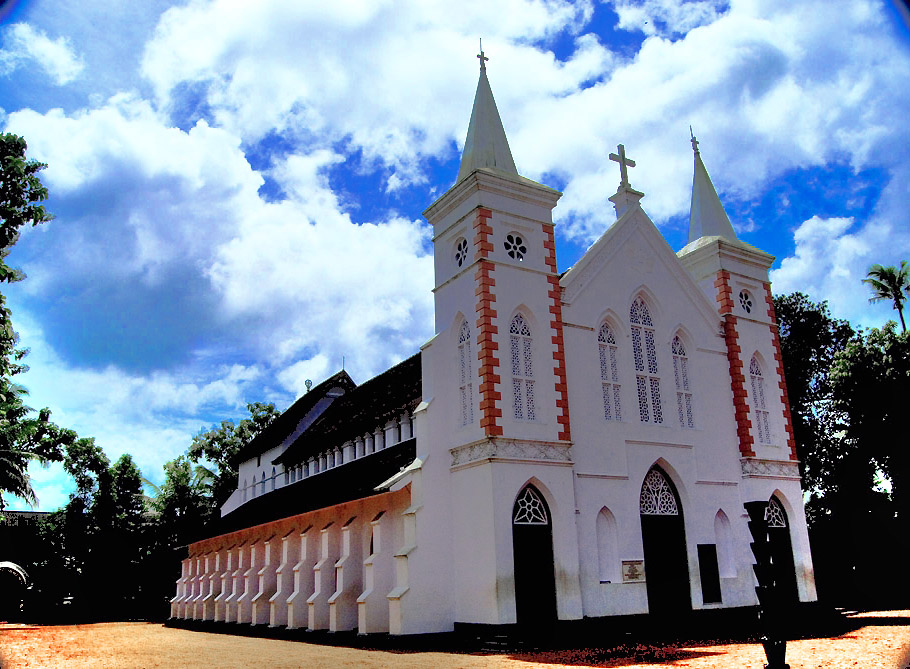
Niranam St. Mary' Church

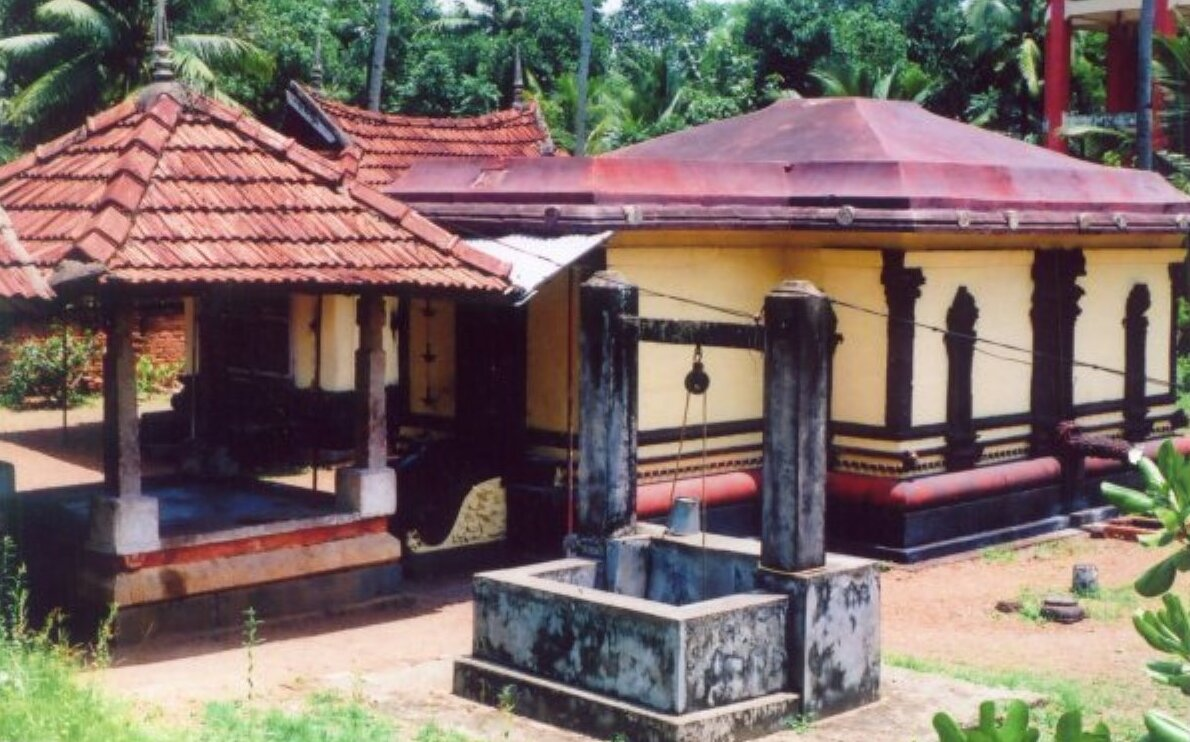
Thrikka Paleswaram Temple

== Demographics ==
Niranam is a large village located in the west of Tiruvalla, with 2837 families residing. The population of Niranam area is 10070, average sex ratio is 1118, higher than the state average of 1084. Niranam has a high literacy rate, 96.01%, higher than the state average of 94%.

== History ==
Niranam is mentioned in the writings of Pliny and Cosmas Indicopleustes as a trade centre where pepper grows and is known to have a variety of different settlers from Greeks to Aryan Jains. Geologists suggest that the sea retracted from this area due to some major geographical changes.

Niranam St Mary's Orthodox Cathedral has been the seat of the various Malankara metropolitans.

The Niranam poets, the "Kannassas" are credited to be pioneers in Malayalam bhakti literature, they authored Bhagavata, Ramayana, and Bharata in Malayalam. They lived in the 14th century CE. The great flood of 1341 AD helped to shift the sea westwards from silt filling in the direct sea route from Niranam.

== Transport ==
Niranam is a quiet place, lying between Kadapra to East and Neerettupuram to North. It can be approached through both the State Highway 12, and State Highway 6. The village lies west to Tiruvalla city centre, about 7 kilometres.

The railway station is about 8 km from Niranam ( Tiruvalla city).

== The Thrikkapaleeshvara Temple ==
Niranam, being an old settlement of both Brahmanic and Christian people, has a composite culture and historical buildings. This is a very old Shiva temple. Like the Sree Vallabha Temple, it also housed a Vedic school system. The temple is in a very old condition, and measures are taken to renovate it. It is believed to be one of the "108 Shiva Temples" established by Parasurama in Kerala by tradition.

== Niranam Valiya Palli (St Marys Orthodox church) ==
It is believed to be one of the oldest churches in Kerala and thus in India as well as among the oldest ones in the world. The architecture shows striking similarities to ancient temple architecture. It is a very important place for the Christians.Pattamukkil Tharavad at niranam is surrounded from three sides of niranam church. Priests From Pattamukkil families used to stay there and done priesthood and governed niranam church and its properties at the ancient days.

== Geography ==
As a result of the flood of 1341, the soil of nearby areas of Niranam is still sandy and resembles beaches, though not close to the Arabian sea.

== Notable people ==
- Anna Rajam Malhotra, India's first woman IAS officer
- Niranam poets
- Sosamma Iype, animal conservationist who won Padma Shri in 2022
- Zacharias Theophilus, Metropolitan of the Mar Thoma Syrian Church

== Other places in Tiruvalla west ==
- Kadapra
- Peringara
- Nedumpuram
- Neerettupuram
- Chathenkery
- Erathodu
