= Cherakarottu Korula Jacob =

Indian bishop

Cherakarottu Korula Jacob was Bishop of Travancore and Cochin in from 1945 to 1957. He was the 6th bishop of the diocese and the first native bishop and the first bishop of the Madhya Kerala Diocese of the Church of South India.

Jacob was born in Pallom in 1886 to T Korula Ashan. He was educated at the University of Madras and joined the CMS College High School as teacher. Later he studied theology at the Cambridge Nicholson Institute. Ordained as an Anglican priest in 1914, he served in Melukavu until 1919. For the next twenty years he was Principal of the Cambridge Nicholson Institute at Kottayam. He then went to Oxford for higher education and was appointed the Archdeacon of Mavelikkara. He was also served as the Principal of the Bishop's College, Calcutta.

Jacob was consecrated a bishop on 6 May 1945 at St George's Cathedral, Madras; he was the first Indian to be elected to a diocesan See, and he was native to his own diocese. On 27 September 1947, he presided over the inaugural service of the Church of South India, the successor to the Anglican Church in South India, after Indian independence. He was also the first moderator of the Church of South India. In acknowledgement of his contributions to the formation of the Church of South India, he was presented an honorary doctorate by the Wycliffe College, in Canada.

Because of his deep Bible knowledge, he used to be called the "Bible Dictionary". He retired from office in 1957 and died on 17 December 1957. He is buried at the CSI Holy Trinity Cathedral, Kottayam.
