= Noel Hodges =

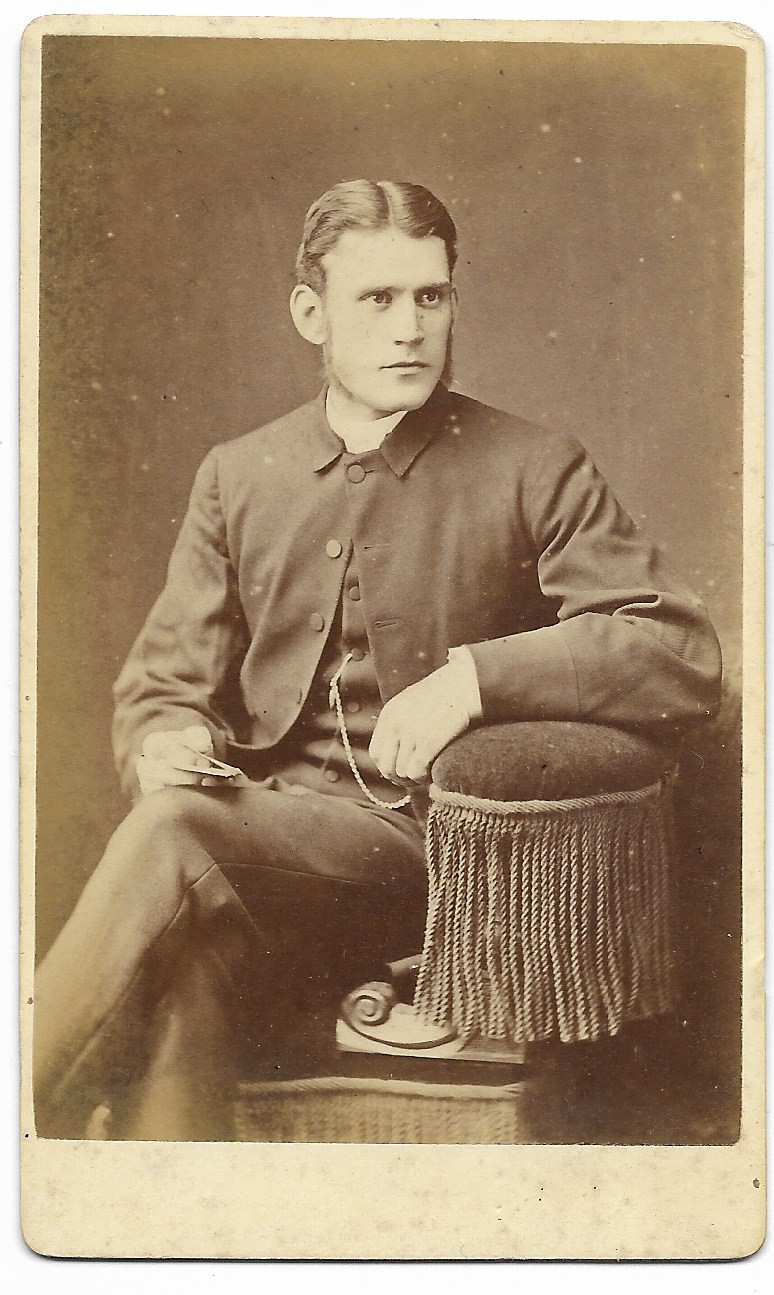
Carte-de-visite, 1877

Edward Noel Hodges (1849 – 18 May 1928) was an Anglican bishop.

Edward Noel Hodges was born in 1849 in Old Dalby, Leicestershire, England, the fourth son and the sixth of nine children of Abraham Hodges (1819–1910) and Jane née Rule (1808–1902). He was educated at The Queen's College, Oxford and ordained in 1873. He was a Tutor at the Mission College, Islington from 1873 to 1877. After this he was Principal of Noble College, Masulipatam; and after that of Trinity College, Kandy. In 1890, he became Bishop of Travancore and Cochin, and was installed at the pro-cathedral in Kottayam during November that year.

Returning to England in 1904, he was an Assistant Bishop in the Diocese of Durham from 1904 to 1907; and in the Diocese of Ely from then until 1914. He was Rector of St Cuthbert's, Bedford from 1907 to 1916; Archdeacon of Bedford from 1910 to 1914; and an Assistant Bishop in the Diocese of St Albans from 1914 to his retirement in 1924.

On 30 June 1877 he married Alice Mary Gordon Shirref (1850–1939) at St. Jude's Church in South Kensington. They had two daughters: Marion Edith (b.1888) and Sybil (b.1889). Hodges died on 18 May 1928 in Bromley, Kent at the age of 79.

Church of England titles
Preceded by John Martindale Speechly	Bishop of Travancore and Cochin; 1890–1904	Succeeded by Charles Hope Gill
Preceded by Frederick Bathurst	Archdeacon of Bedford; 1910–1914	Succeeded by Arthur Henry Parnell
