= Zacharias Theophilus =

Metropolitan of the Mar Thoma Syrian Church

His Grace The Rt Rev Dr Zacharias Mar Theophilus of the Apostolic Throne of St Thomas
- Suffragan Metropolitan
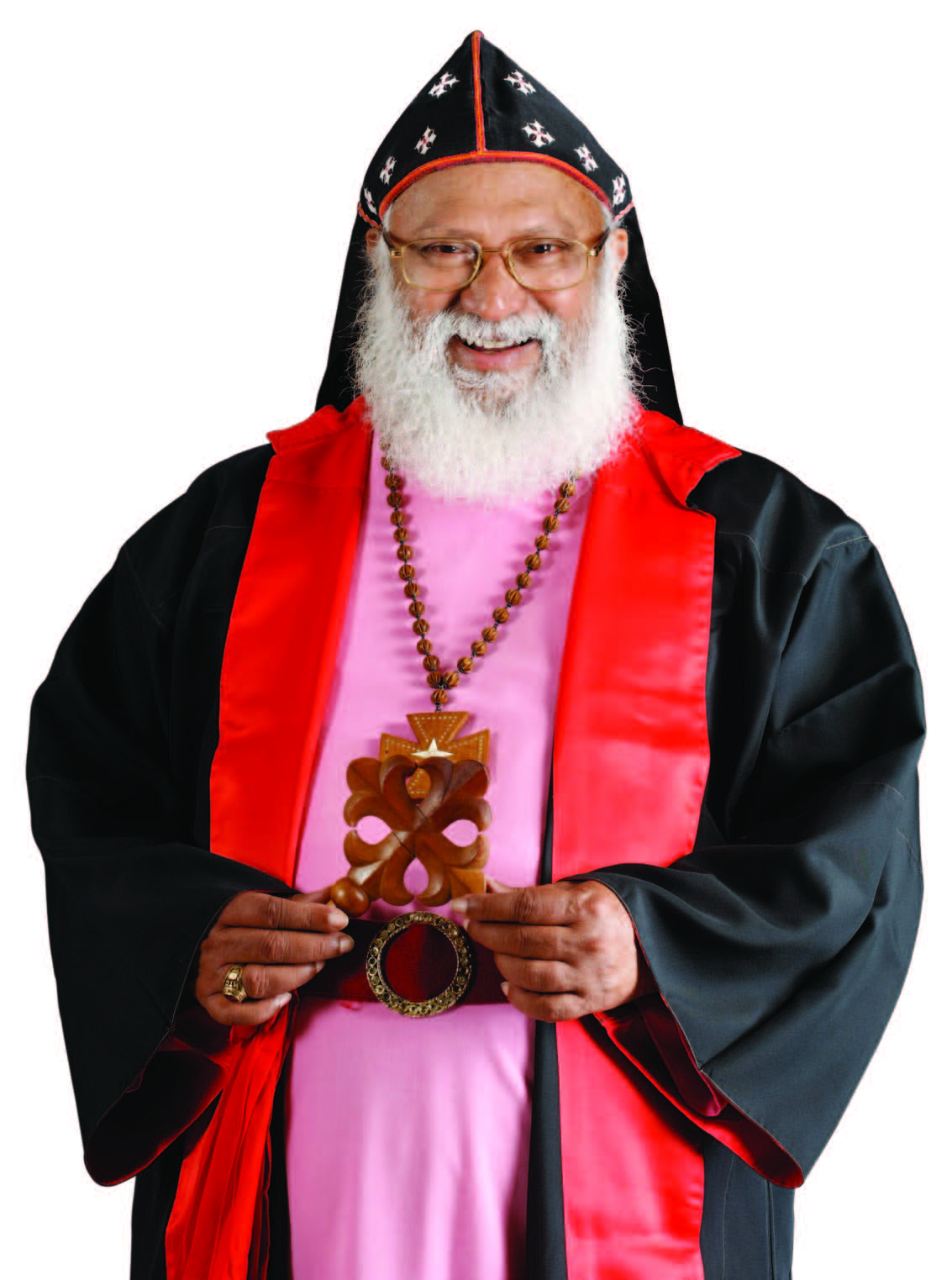
- Church: Mar Thoma Syrian Church
- Diocese: Chenganur- Mavelikara
- See: Apostolic See St Thomas
- Installed: As Suffragan Metropolitan:3 July 2004
- Other posts: Member of the Central Committee and Executive Committee of the World Council of Churches Member of Special Commission of Orthodox Participation in the World Council of Churches

Orders
- Ordination: 9 July 1966 by Juhanon Mar Thoma Metropolitan
- Consecration: 1 May 1980 by Alexander Mar Thoma Metropolitan
- Rank: Suffragan Metropolitan to the Apostolic Throne of St Thomas

Personal details
- Born: Oommen Koruth; 29 August 1938 Niranam
- Died: 27 December 2015 (aged 77) Trivandrum
- Buried: Syrian Christian Seminary, Thiruvalla
- Parents: Mr. V K Oommen and Mrs. Mariamma

Zacharias Mar Theophilus (born Oommen Koruth; 29 August 1938 – 27 December 2015) was the Suffragan Metropolitan of the Mar Thoma Syrian Church. The Mar Thoma Syrian Church is believed to be established by St Thomas, The Apostle of Jesus Christ and is believed to be the continuation of the ancient Christian community of India.

== Early days ==
Oommen Koruth was born on 29 August 1938 to V.K. Oommen and Mariamma. V.K. Oommen was a Christian and a postmaster. His mother Mariamma was a teacher and the daughter of Iykareth Joseph Asan (teacher) of Puthencavu. The family inherited a rich Christian tradition and heritage and made sure that their children understood the importance of this tradition. Oommen's parents were very particular in giving Christian education as well as secular education to all their children.

=== Education ===
Oommen Koruth started his early schooling in Kadapra School where his mother was a teacher. He joined the Niranam St Mary's School for his high school education and received his secondary school leaving certificate. He passed his intermediate level examination from NSS College, Changanassery. Oommen joined the Union Christian College, Alwaye and completed his graduate studies in science. Later on he received his Bachelor's in education from Titus II Teachers College.

After receiving the call to priesthood, Oommen Koruth joined the Jabalpur Theological Seminary for his bachelor's degree in divinity. In the course of near future, he received a master's degree in theology from Princeton Theological Seminary and later completed his Doctoral studies in Missions from Boston University.

== Career ==
Before deciding to be a priest, Oommen Koruth started his career as a school teacher. He taught in Thevari School, Alwaye Settlement High School, Perumbavoor Ashram High School, Mysore St Thomas High School and Trivandrum Mar Thoma Residential School. He was a respected teacher and was imbibed with a nationalistic spirit and led a life in conformity with the Gandhian Teachings. He as a teacher used to wear a white jubba and a white dhothi at all times that represented the Indian gurus.

The time spent as a teacher in the Ashram School and Perumbavoor was more of a preparatory time of prayer and meditation which ultimately led him to the path of ministry in the Church. While he was there, he spent a lot of time in prayer with his colleagues especially Dr T M Thomas. During such a prayer, he received a call to join the Church as a minister. He declared to his colleagues of his decision to leave teaching and to join the ministry of the Church as a celibate.

=== Episcopacy and suffragan metropolitanate ===
While a priest, the Sabha Pradhinidhi Mandalam (Highest Democratic Body of the Mar Thoma Church) elected him to the episcopate. On 26 April 1980 he was made a ramban by the then Suffragan Metropolitan Philipose Mar Chrysostom. On 1 May 1980 Rev Oommen Koruth was consecrated as Bishop of the Mar Thoma Syrian Church and was given the name Zacharias Mar Theophilus by the then Mar Thoma Metropolitan Dr. Alexander Mar Thoma. Later, Thirumeni was transferred to the Diocese of North America as the Diocesan Episcopa(bishop) 1991. Under his leadership, the diocese, which was only a few churches, grew into a big institution and during this term, the Sinai Mar Thoma Centre is purchased and developed in New York (2320 Merrick Avenue). He continued in the diocese until 2001, when he was successed by Rt. Rev. Dr. Euyakim Mar Coorilos Episcopa. On 3 July 2004 Zacharias Mar Theophilus was installed as the Suffragan Metropolitan of the Church of St Thomas. As a bishop he served in the Dioceses of Adoor Mavelikara, Kottayam-Ranni, Kottayam- Kochi, Kunnamkulam-Malabar, North America and Europe and Chenganoor-Mavelikara.

== Ecumenism ==
Zacharias Theophilus was deeply committed to ecumenism. The Ecumenical journey of Mar Theophilus began from the beds of River Pamba. He has been an active participant of Bible society, Student Christian Movement, National Missionary Society, Ecumenical Christian Centre etc. In the 1980s he served as an executive of the Christian Conference of Asia. Bishop Theophilus's relationship with the World Council of Churches began with his attendance in the 1989 World Mission and Evangelism Conference held in San Antonio. The first WCC Assembly that he attended was held at Canberra in 1991. There he was elected to the Central Committee of the World Council of Churches and later to the Executive members of the WCC. The same process also repeated in the Harare assembly of the WCC which was held on 1998. He attended as the representative of the Mar Thoma Church in the 1998 Lambeth Conference. He was Ecumenical Advisor of the Mar Thoma Church's Delegation in the WCC General Assembly of 2006 held in Porto Alegre, Brazil. He represented the WCC in various ecumenical and pastoral solidarity visits as part of the Decade to Overcome Violence (2001-2010). Zacharias Mar Theophilus was also a member of the Special Commission on Orthodox Participation in the WCC, a member of the WCC Asia Regional Group (1999-2006) and the WCC-CCA Joint Working Group.

His efforts in the WCC alongside other Ecumenical leaders of the Mar Thoma Syrian Church led to the Mar Thoma Syrian Church officially being proclaimed as an Independent Family of its own, that is Independent, Oriental and Orthodox. The Church was recognized as a separate ecclesiastical traditional church which blends unique attribute from the Syriac Orient theology at the same time reformed in its social and evangelical mission.

== Death ==
On his way back from Muscat after the Christmas Programs, Theophilus suffered a brain hemorrhage mid-flight and was hospitalized in an unconscious state after reaching Kerala. On 26 December 2015 he died. His body was laid in rest at a specially constructed tomb at the headquarters of the Mar Thoma Syrian Church of Malabar.
