= Baker Memorial Girls High School =

Location
- Kottayam, Kerala; India; 9.5933°N 76.5242°E

Information
- Motto: Love never faileth
- Established: 1819; 207 years ago
- Founder: Amelia Dorothea Baker
- Gender: Girls
- Enrollment: Over 1400
- Website: bakergirlshss.in

Baker Memorial Girls Higher Secondary School is a girls' higher secondary school located in Kottayam, Kerala, India. It was established in 1819. It was the first school of its kind established in India. In 1952 it became the first school in the country to start a Girl Guides unit to promote social service with its students.

Amelia Dorothea Baker, wife of Henry Baker founded the school in 1819, initially with twelve students. By 1829 there were 42 students. The children were taught textile crafts as well as other subjects, so that they could earn money after they left. One of the school's aims was also to make its students fit wives for missionaries and pastors, and sometimes the school contributed to students' dowries.

In 1893 Mrs Baker Jr. and her daughters took charge of the school. It was accorded the status of a lower secondary school by the department of education in 1894 and become 'Miss Bakers School' — a memorial to the early Miss Bakers. The school was upgraded into a high school in 1904 and affiliated to the state government of Kerala in 1952. The school was further upgraded into a Higher Secondary school in 1998. Although the school is Christian it accepts students of all classes and creeds. It has been called "one of the best English Schools in Travancore".

The school celebrated its bicentennial in 2019. Its motto is "Love Never Faileth".
