= C.M.S. Press =

First printing press in Kerala

- Type: Private
- Industry: Printing
- Founded: 1821
- Headquarters: Kottayam, India

C.M.S. Press was the first malayalam printing press in Kerala, India. It was established in 1821 by Rev. Benjamin Baily, a British missionary, at Kottayam College, also known as Syrian College. The college was a seat of English general education in the State of Travancore and is regarded as "the first locale to start English education" in Kerala and the first to have Englishmen as teachers in 1815. Since the missionaries stayed in the residence of Kottayam College, they established the first press in Kerala there, now called Pazhaya Seminary or Old Seminary in Chungom, Kottayam.

== History ==
The first Malayalam book printed in Kerala, Cherupaitangalku Upakarardham Englishil ninnu Paribhashapedutiya Kadhakal, which consists of short stories for children translated from English by Benjamin Baily, was printed at C.M.S. press in Kottayam in 1824. C.M.S. Press published a complete Malayalam translation of the Bible in 1842 and a Malayalam–English Dictionary in 1846. Njananikshepam (in Malayalam: ജ്ഞാനനിക്ഷേപം), the first printed newspaper published in Kerala, was printed and published in 1848 by C.M.S. Press.

C.M.S. Press printed works in Malayalam, English, Tamil, Sanskrit, Latin and Syriac. It was the first multilingual printing office as well as the first book publishing house in Kerala.

== See also ==
- Printing press
- Church Missionary Society
- Media in Kerala
