= Shikarpur, Muzaffarnagar =

Shikarpur is a town in Muzaffarnagar District, Uttar Pradesh, India, on the right bank of the Hindon River, with a railway station, 30 km south east of the district capital Muzaffarnagar.
