= Thazhakkara =

- Census Town
- Location in Kerala, India Thazhakkara (India)
- Coordinates: 9.2551°N 76.5539°E
- Country: India
- State: Kerala
- District: Alappuzha

Government
  - Body: Grama Panchayat

Area
  - Total: 25.26 km^{2} (9.75 sq mi)

Population (2011)
  - Total: 14,596
  - Density: 1,391/km^{2} (3,600/sq mi)

Languages
  - gOf: Malayalam, English
- Time zone: UTC+5:30 (IST)
- PIN: 690102
- Telephone code: 0479
- Nearest city: Mavelikkara
- Sex ratio: 1093 : 1000 ♂/♀
- Literacy: 95%%
- Lok Sabha constituency: Mavelikkara
- Vidhan Sabha constituency: Mavelikkara
- Civic agency: Grama Panchayat
- Website: www.lsg.kerala.gov.in

Thazhakkara is a village in Alappuzha district in the Indian state of Kerala. Thazhakkara is one among the five Villages in Mavelikkara Taluk in Alappuzha District. Justice C.T.Ravikumar, Judge of Supreme Court of India is a native of Thazhakara.

== Demographics ==
As of 2011 India census, Thazhakkara had a population of 14,596 with 6,719 males and 7,877 females.

== Economy ==
Some of the industries based in Thazhakkara are:

- Travancore Oxygen (near Kunnam)
- Sangrose Laboratories (in Mavelikkara), which specialises in the manufacture of soft-gelatin capsules. It is also one of the only companies in the world to manufacture clofazimine.
- SCC ready mix concrete ( Industrial estate)

Local Self Government

Thazhakkara PanchayatThazhakara Panchayat has 21 wards. They are Thazhakara A, Thazhakara B, Vazhuvadi, Kunnam, Kunnam H.S, Kochalummoode, Mankamkuzhi Town, Erattapallikoodam, Kallimel, Vettiyar, Vettiyar HS, Kottemala, Thannikunnu, Parakulangara, Eravankara, Murivayikkara, Arunoottimangalam, PHC Ward, Seed Farm, Kallumala and Aakkanattukara. ThazhakkaraPanchayat is situated between latitude of 9º14" north and a longitude of 76º33" east, at the south-east part in Alappuzha District. On the northernside is Achankovil River, in the west Mavelikkara Municipality, Thekkekara of Mavelikkara, ChunakkaraPanchayat and Nooranadu Panchayat are on the eastern side. The local people havetwo opinions about the history of the name as Thazhakkara. When all these placeswere under the majestic rule of Edappally Swaraoopam, this place was seen as‘Thalakkara’ since this area was at the top level socially, economically, educationally, culturally and geographically and later it became ‘Thazhakkara’.

== Notables ==
- Justice C. T.Ravikumar, Judge Supreme Court of India
