= Mundathanam =

- Village
- Location in Kerala, India Mundathanam (India)
- Coordinates: 9°29′41″N 76°42′30″E
- Country: India
- State: Kerala
- District: Kottayam
- Elevation: 111 m (364 ft)

Population (2001)
  - Total: 1,241(7km2)

Languages
  - Official: Malayalam, Sanskrit, English, Hindi
- Time zone: UTC+5:30 (IST)
- PIN: 686541 (mundathanam po)
- Telephone code: 91 0481 249
- Vehicle registration: KL 33
- Website: http://lsgkerala.in/kangazhapanchayat

Mundathanam is a place in Kangazha Village, Changanassery Taluk and Kottayam District of Kerala State in India. It is located in eastern part of Kottayam district and adjacent to Pathanamthitta district. It is well connected to Changanacherry. Mundathanam is famous for almost all Christian denominations and their churches.

The nearest railway stations are Kottayam (29 km) and Changanacherry (26 km) and Thiruvalla (26 Km) and the nearest Airport are Cochin Airport (Nedumbassery ) (105 km) and (Thiruvananthapuram) Airport (Trivandrum) (143 Km) away and (12 Km) away from proposed Sabari International Airport.

Nearest places

- Pathanadu 3 km
- Kulathoormoozhi 4 km
- Manimala 12 km
- Karukachal12 Km
- Kottayam 29 Km
- Changanachery 26 Km
- Mallappally 9 Km
- Thiruvalla 26 Km

== Culture ==
The majority of the people are farmers. They cultivate rubber, black pepper, coffee, coconut trees and tapioca.

== Healthcare ==
1. Salvation Army Hospital Edayappara is the main healthcare center.
2. Primary Health Centre Mundathanam

== Educational institutions in Mundathanam ==
1. C.M.S LP School, Mundathanam.
2. N.M UP School.
3. Bethany Christian English medium School.
4. Little Flower Vidyanikethan & junior college, C.B.S.E., Mundathanam.

== Economy ==
The economy of Mundathanam is primarily from agriculture. Mundathanam is one of the rubber producing villages in Kerala because the hilly terrain, high humidity and good rain make it suitable for rubber cultivation. Other major crops are coconut, tapioca and pepper. NRIs are also another major source of income

== Demographics ==
As of 2011 India census, Mundathanam had a population of 1245 of which 578 are males and 667 are females

== Climate ==
Mundathanam experiences a tropical climate with sufficient rainfalls in the months of June, July, August and October. Average precipitation here is 391.4 mm. Humidity rises during the months of March and April. Average annual temperature is 31.14 °C. Temperature falls during the end of year. The place also receives locally developed thundershowers.
