= Kumplampoika =

Kumplampoika Kumbalampoika
- village
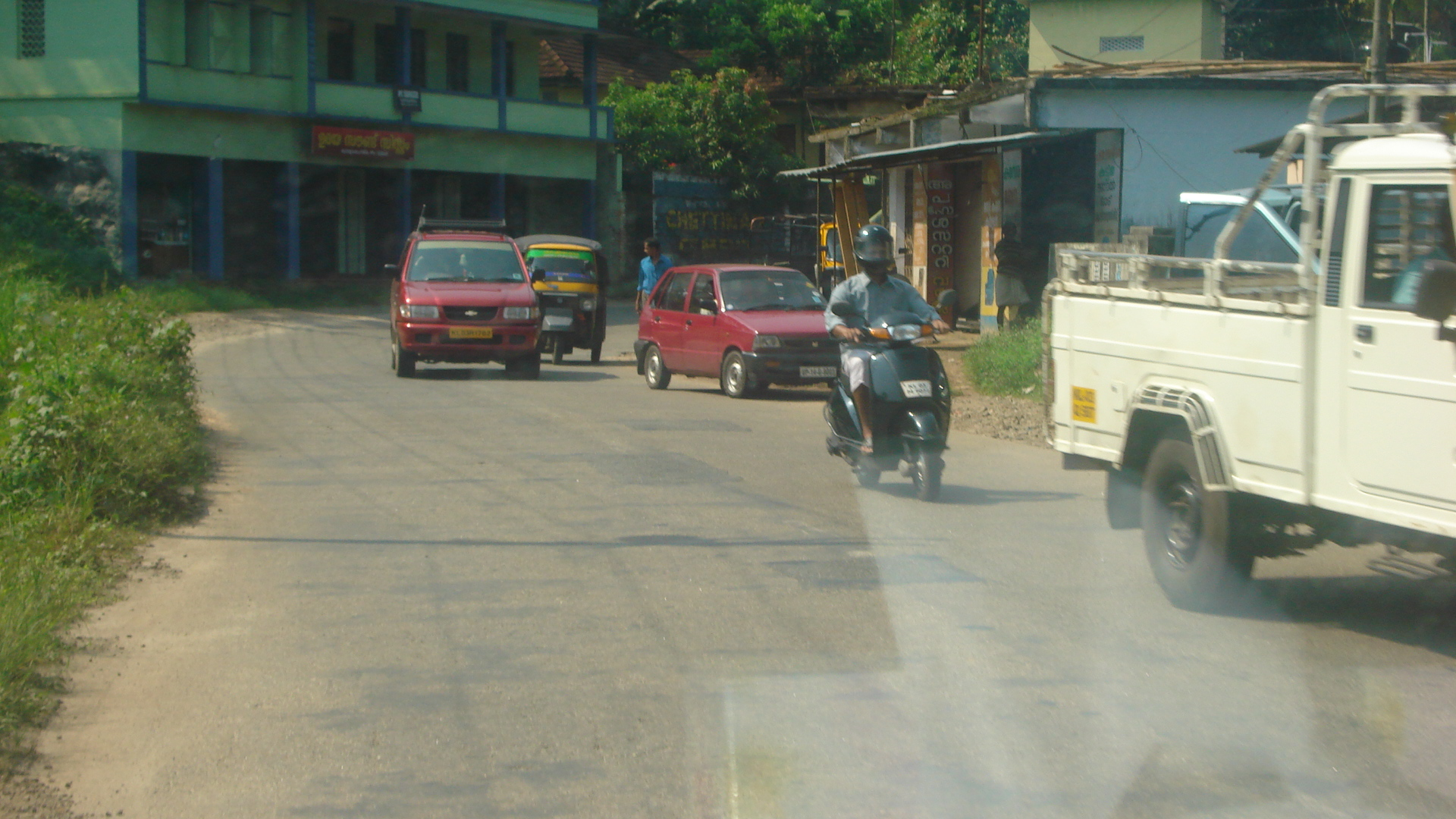
- Kumpalam poika
- Interactive map of Kumplampoika
- Coordinates: 9°19′0″N 76°48′0″E
- Country: India
- State: Kerala
- District: Pathanamthitta

Government
  - Type: Panchayath

Area
  - Total: 10 km^{2} (3.9 sq mi)

Population (2008)
  - Total: 10,000
  - Density: 1,000/km^{2} (2,600/sq mi)

Languages
  - Official: Malayalam, English
- Time zone: UTC+5:30 (IST)
- PIN: 689661
- Telephone code: 04735
- Vehicle registration: KL-03
- Nearest city: Pathanamthitta
- Sex ratio: 1000m:1000f ♂/♀
- Literacy: 99%
- Lok Sabha constituency: Pathanamthitta
- Climate: Moderate (Köppen)

Kumplampoika is a village in Pathanamthitta district of Kerala, India.

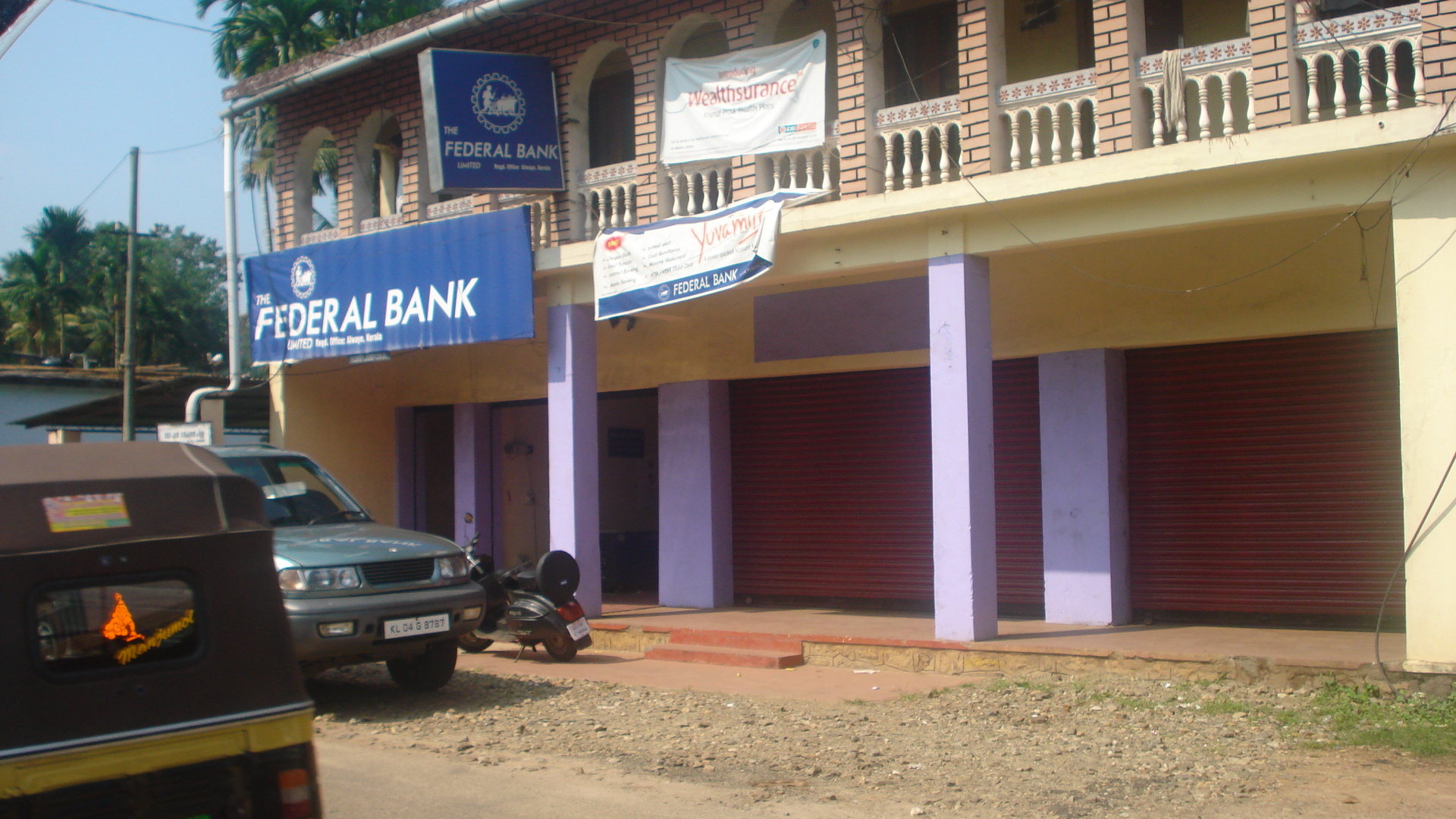
Kumpalampoika Town

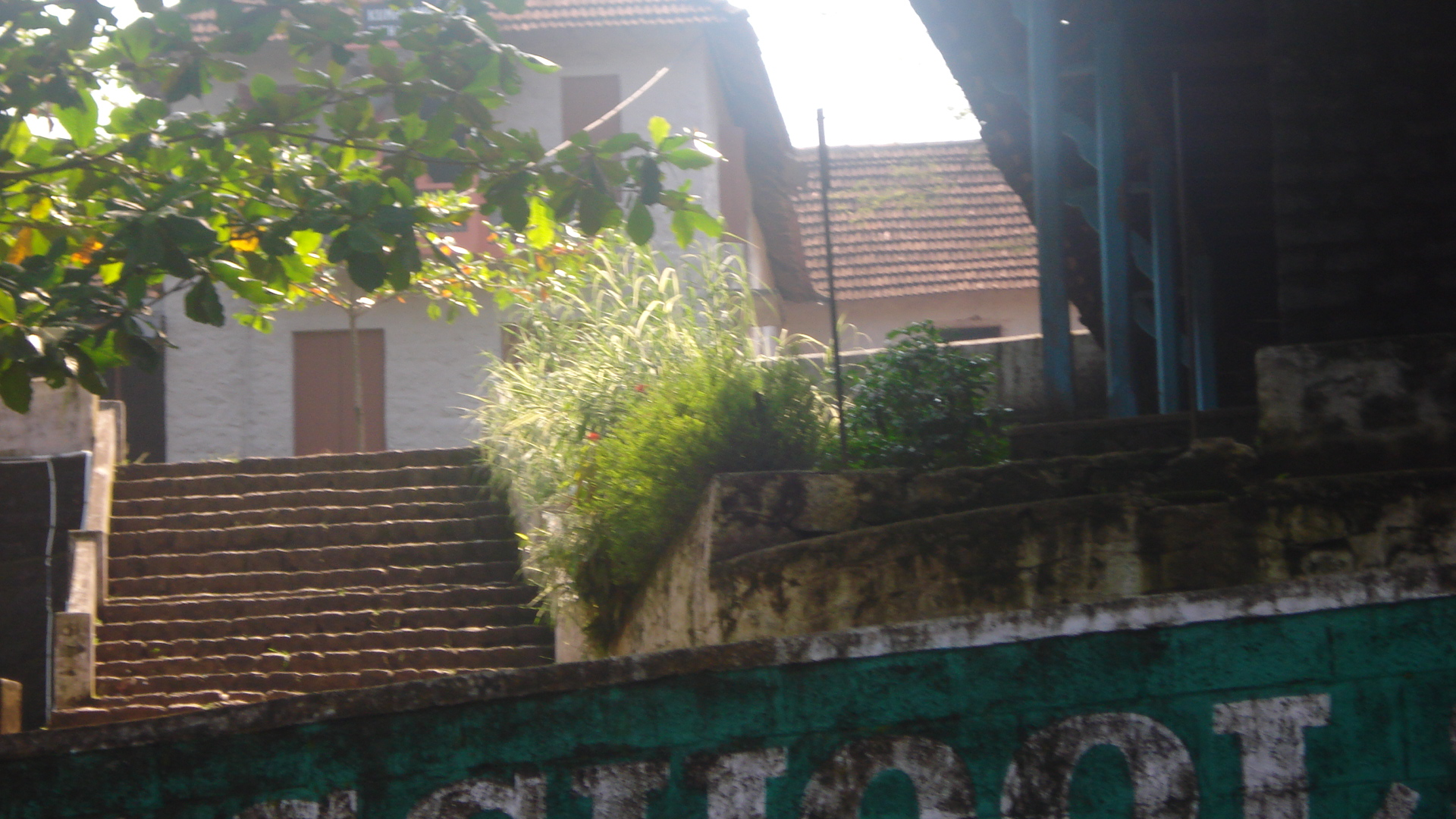
Kumplampoika Highschool

== History ==
Kumplampoika evolved out of "Kumbhi Ulavum Poika" which literally connotes the presence of "Kumbhi" (elephant) in the village until a few hundred years back.

== Landmarks ==
There are three churches, temples, branches of major banks, library (Bodleian library, RegNo. 03 RNI 1797 affiliated by State Library council), co-operative societies, a retail market, and a vegetable market.

== Transportation ==
Kumplampoika is 8 km equidistant from Pathanamthitta and Ranni.

== Colleges ==
- MUSALIAR COLLEGE OF ARTS & SCIENCE, CHEENKALTHADOM, MALAYALAPPUZHA, PATHANAMTHITTA

== Economy ==
The main contribution to the economy is in the form of remittance from NRIs and rubber plantations and other low scale farm cultivation.
