= Bishop Hodges Higher Secondary School, Mavelikkara =

Coordinates: 9°15′20″N 76°32′35″E

Bishop Hodges Higher Secondary School, Mavelikara

Location
- Mavelikara, Kerala; India

Information
- Type: Aided
- Established: 1839; 186 years ago
- Staff: Varies
- Enrollment: Varies
- Campus: Rural

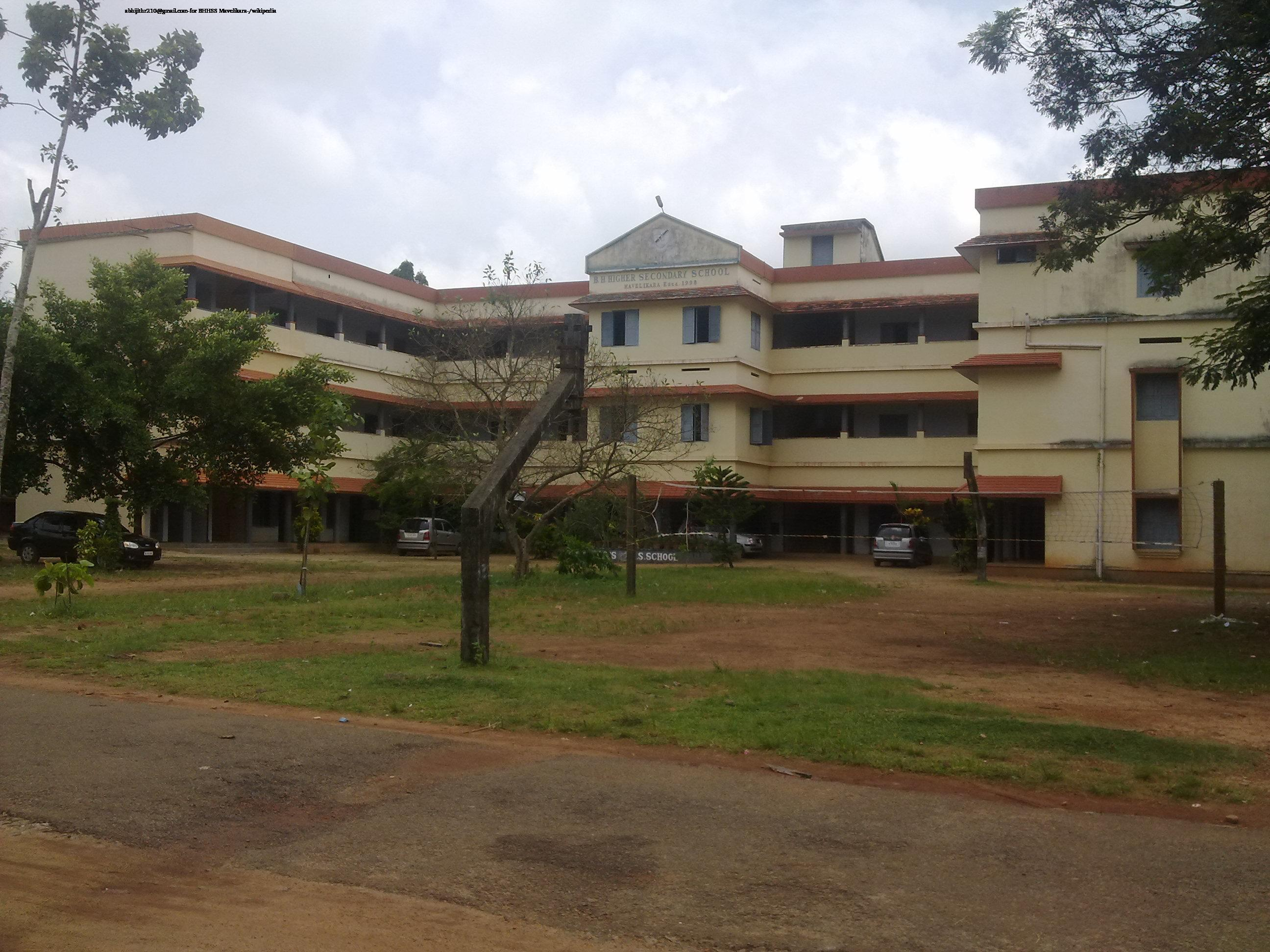
Bishop Hodges H. S. School

Bishop Hodges Higher Secondary School', is under C.S.I. Madhya Kerala Diocese in Alleppey District. The school is located at the heart of Mavelikara town (near to Kayamkulam-Thiruvalla highway).

== History ==
The institution is founded in the year 1839 as a high school. The school was upgraded to higher secondary in 1998. The school has classes from 5th standard to 12th standard

== Curriculum ==
The school follows Kerala State Syllabus of Education (SCERT) for classes from 5th to 10th.

- Medium of teaching is both Malayalam and English

== Higher Secondary ==
For Higher Secondary following courses are offered under Higher Secondary Board syllabus.

- Science - Biology Stream -Physics, Chemistry, Botany, Zoology and Mathematics
- Science -Computer Science stream -Physics, Chemistry, Computer Science and Maths
- Science - Electronics stream - Physics, Chemistry, Electronics and Mathematics
- Commerce
- Humanities

Second languages offered are ((Hindi)) & ((Malayalam))

== Buildings ==
The school has five separate blocks of buildings for each sections.(Upper Primary, High School, Higher Secondary)

== Physical activity grounds ==
The school has a basketball court, volleyball court, cricket ground in its premises.

== Noted Alumni ==
- P. C. Alexander
- Air Commodore George Verghis, AVSM

== See also ==
- Church of South India
- SSLC
- Secondary School
- Education in India
