= Bethel Ashram, Thiruvalla =

- Founded: 1922
- Founder: Miss Edith Neve & Miss Rachel Joseph
- Founded at: Alappuzha
- Type: Community
- Headquarters: Warikad, Thiruvalla
- Location: India
- Website: https://www.bethelashram.org

Bethel Ashram is an institution which exclusively works for needs among women. The ashram is situated at Warikkad, Thiruvalla in Kerala state of India.

== History ==
In 1922, Miss Edith Neve, a C.M.S. missionary, felt the need to serve the women of the diocese in a wider sphere than in the training school (B.I. Pallom) where she was working. Miss Rachel Joseph, a high school teacher, joined her in the new venture. They rented a house in Alappuzha and undertook various activities among the women there. The name 'Bethel' was adopted, and their work soon attracted women students from all parts of the Diocese. Bethel moved to permanent quarters at Warikkad, Tiruvalla, in 1926.

== Location ==
Bethel Ashram is located at Warikkad which is on the Thiruvalla–Mallapally road and has an area of 20 acres.

== Administration ==
The ashram is managed by Madhya Kerala Diocese of Church of South India. The administration of the ashram is handled by sisters at Bethel Ashram. The current Bethel mother is Sister Shanta Joseph and Asst. Mother is Sister P. J Annnama.

== Activities ==
The ashram runs an old age home which caters to elderly people and mentally ill patients. A nursery school which is named 'Shanti Nursery School', an orphanage and a playschool is also functioning at Bethel Ashram. Two boarding homes which is named as 'Shanti' and 'Love cottage' has the facility to study up to 7th standard. A chapel has been constructed at Bethel Ashram in 1935 and been consecrated the same year itself. A community center which is called 'Karunalayam' provides training to women in sewing and switching.

== Bethel Ashram branches ==
Bethel Ashram has various branches in Kerala at Trichur, Melukavu, Fern Hill bethel at Trivandrum and Kallada, which is near Kollam. Outside Kerala the branches are at Parkal, Bhagirathapetta and Patpara.

== See also ==
- Madhya Kerala Diocese
- Church of South India
