= Bishops in Foreign Countries Act 1841 =

Act of the Parliament of the United Kingdom

Bishops in Foreign Countries Act 1841 (Note: The citation of this act by this short title was authorised by section 1 of, and the first schedule to, the Short Titles Act 1896. Due to the repeal of those provisions it is now authorised by section 19(2) of the Interpretation Act 1978.)
- Act of Parliament
- Parliament of the United Kingdom
- Long title: An Act to amend an Act made in the Twenty-sixth Year of the Reign of His Majesty King George the Third, intituled “An Act to empower the Archbishop of Canterbury or the Archbishop of York for the Time being to consecrate to the Office of a Bishop Persons being Subjects or Citizens of Countries out of His Majesty’s Dominions.”
- Citation: 5 Vict. c. 6
- Territorial extent: United Kingdom

Dates
- Royal assent: 5 October 1841
- Commencement: 5 October 1841 (Note: The Acts of Parliament (Commencement) Act 1793.)
Other legislation
Amends	Consecration of Bishops Abroad Act 1786
Amended by	Colonial Clergy Act 1874; Statute Law Revision Act 1874 (No. 2); Statute Law Revision (No. 2) Act 1890

Status: Amended

Text of statute as originally enacted

Revised text of statute as amended

Text of the Bishops in Foreign Countries Act 1841 as in force today (including any amendments) within the United Kingdom, from legislation.gov.uk.

The Bishops in Foreign Countries Act 1841 (5 Vict. c. 6) is an act of the Parliament of the United Kingdom to enable the United Church of England and Ireland to create bishops overseas.

The act authorised the consecration of a bishop for a foreign country who need not be a subject of the British crown nor take the oaths of allegiance or of supremacy, while, on the other hand, the clergy ordained by him would have no right to officiate in England or Ireland.

The need for the act arose after the English Church and government agreed to consent to the establishment of the Anglican-German Bishopric in Jerusalem.

The act received royal assent on 5 October 1841 and remains, as of 2026, largely in force.

== Subsequent developments ==
Section 4 of the act was repealed by section 2 of, and schedule (A.) to, the Colonial Clergy Act 1874 (37 & 38 Vict. c. 77), which came into force on 7 August 1874.

== Bibliography ==
- Doe, N. (1996). The Legal Framework of the Church of England: A Critical Study in a Comparative Context. Oxford: Oxford University Press. p. p.171. ISBN 0-19-826220-5. (Google Books)
- Meyer, P. (1914) "Jerusalem, Anglican-German Bishopric in", Schaff-Herzog Encyclopedia of Religious Knowledge
