= Pallom =

- Village
- Location within Kerala Location within India
- Country: India

Languages Malayalam
- Time zone: UTC+5:30 (IST)
- Vehicle registration: KL

Pallom is a block situated 6.5 km south of Kottayam town and 12.4 km north of Changanassery, in the Indian state of Kerala.

The history of Pallom(Pallam) is described in the book India Gazateer & Bhoomisasthra Nighandu by Joseph Edamaruk. Edathil Palace of Thekkumkoor Dynasty is located here.

== Notable people ==
- Pallom Madhavan, Kathakali musician
- Ennackal Chandy George Sudarshan, theoretical physicist

== See also ==
- Kottayam
- Kottayam district
- Kottayam-Malabar
