= Kallumala =

- village
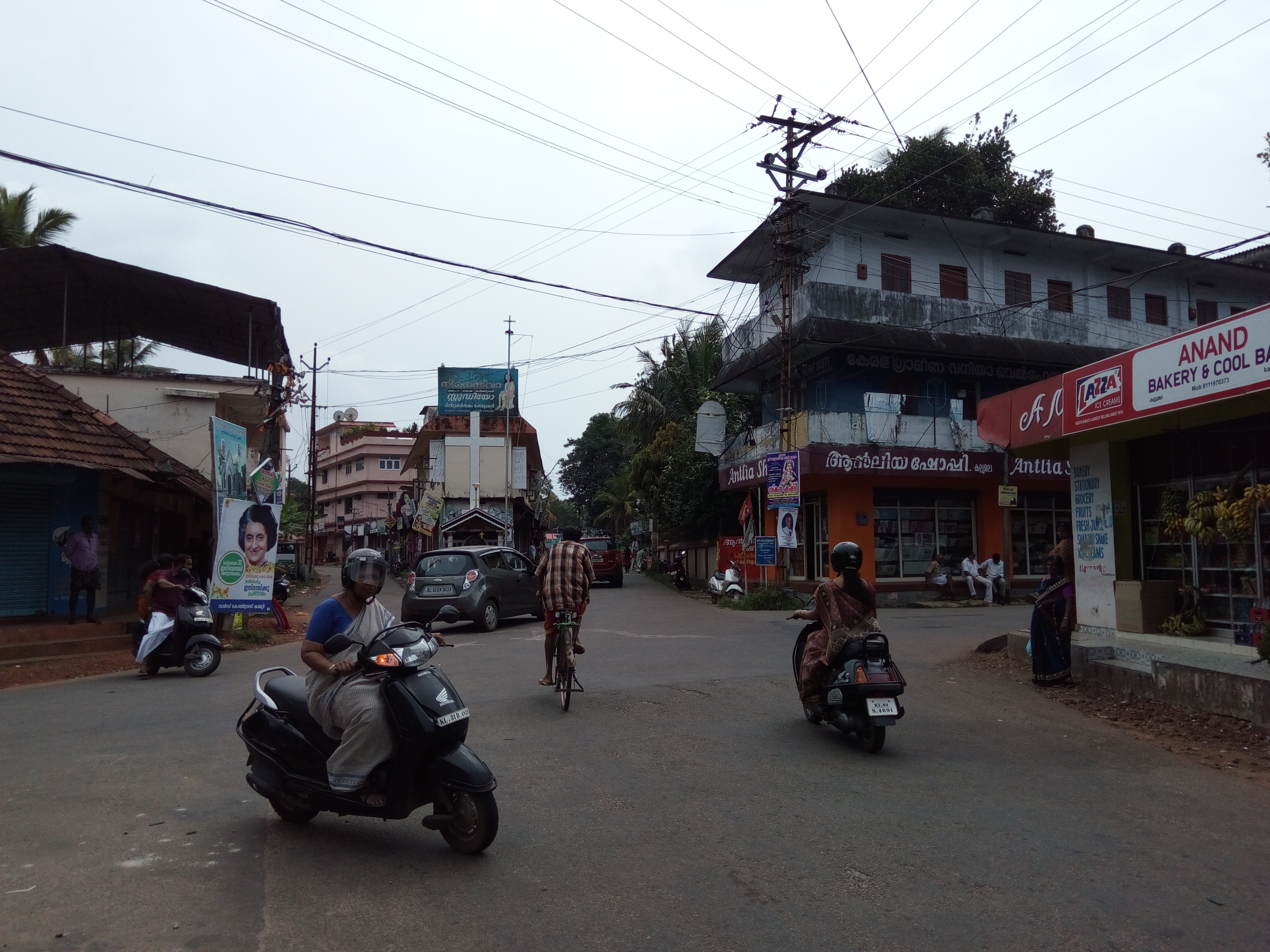
- kallumala college junction

- Location in Kerala, India Kallumala (India)
- Coordinates: 9.234°N 76.550°E
- Country: India
- State: Kerala
- District: Alappuzha

Government
  - Body: Thazhakara grama panchayat

Languages
  - Official: Malayalam, English
- Time zone: UTC+5:30 (IST)
- PIN: 690110
- Telephone code: +91-479
- Vehicle registration: KL-31
- Nearest city: Mavelikara (3 km)
- Literacy: 86.00%
- Website: alappuzha.nic.in/mavelikara_taluk.html

Kallumala is a village near Mavelikara railway station in Mavelikara taluk. It is the twenty-first ward of Thazhakkara grama panchayat in Alappuzha district in the Indian state of Kerala.

== Education ==
CMS LP School established in 1856 was the first school in Kallumala. In 1964 Bishop Moore College was established at Kallumala. Bishop Moore Vidyapith Mavelikara, a I-XII school was established in 1975 as an offshoot of the college.

== Geography ==
Mavelikara is a region of sandy mud, while Kallumala is a hill with laterite soil. Kallumala consist of two squares, the college square (Vadakkemukku) and the Thekkemukku square, which are connected with two roads.

== Religious places ==
- Kallumala Siva Temple
- Akkanattukara Siva temple
- St. Pauls CSI Church
- St. Gregorios Orthodox church
- St. Mary's Malankara Syrian Catholic Church (Bethany Church)

== Infrastructure ==
- Indian Overseas Bank (with ATM)
- Catholic Syrian Bank
- Federal Bank (ATM only)
- SBI (ATM only)
- Kallumala agricultural co-operative bank
- Post office

== Educational institutions ==
- Bishop Moore college aided
- CMS LP school
- Mar Ivanios College (unaided)
- Bishop Moore Vidyapith (unaided)
- St Mary's Cathedral Public School Mavelikara (unaided)

== Healthcare ==
- Ashwini Ayurvedasram
- P M Varghese Memorial Hospital
- PuthiyaDam Hospital

Other establishments include Kiran studio, Jemini studio, Mambally medicals, Illikkal medicals, Panackal stores and Nadavallil store, along with many grocery shops. A ration shop is located near to the junction.

== Notable people ==
- P. C. Alexander secretary to Indira Gandhi
- Valson Thampu Delhi University
- Chitramezhuthu K. M. Varghese
- K. K. Sudhakaran (novelist)
