= Valson Thampu =

Indian educator and Christian theologian

- Occupation: Principal (academia)

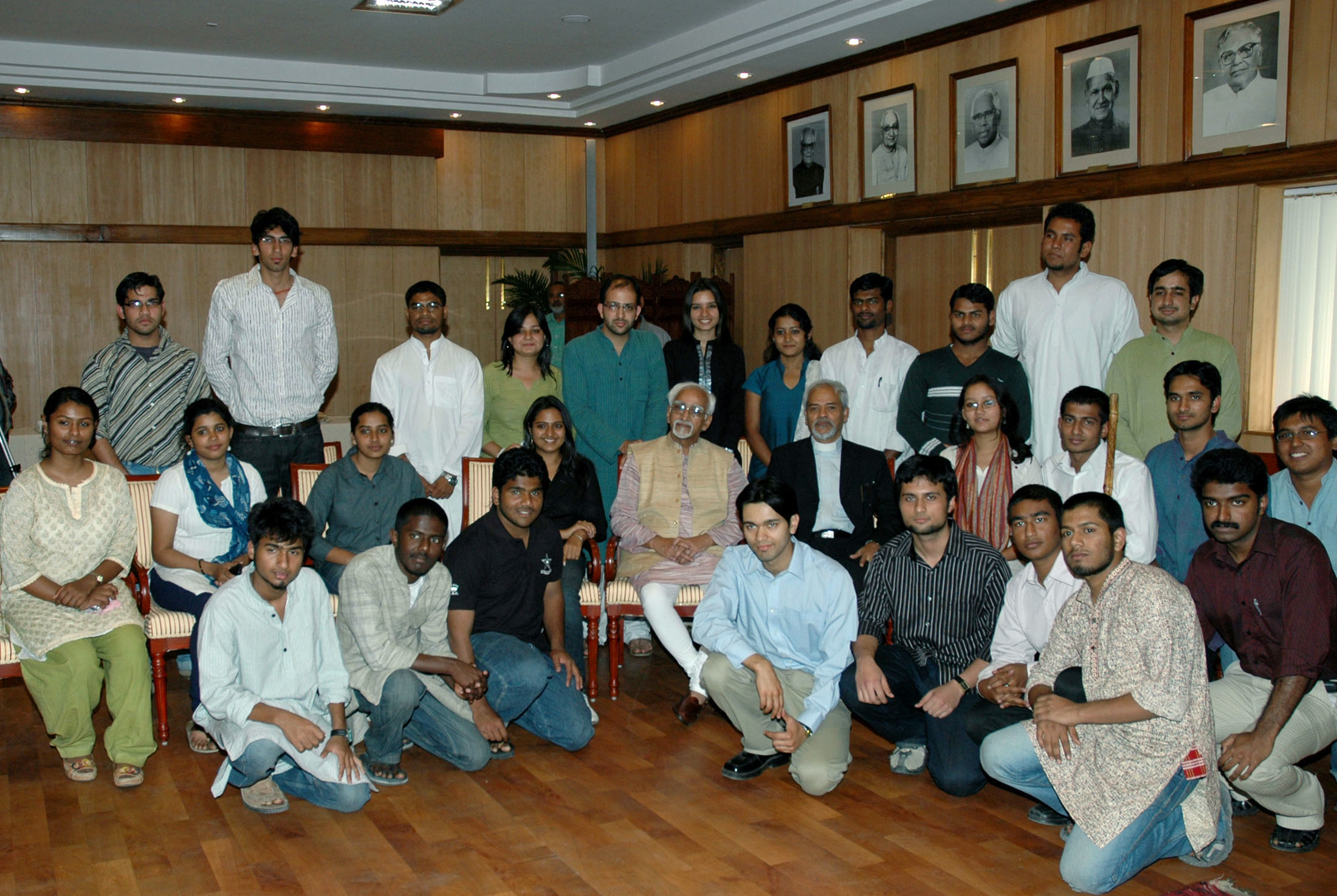
The Vice President, Shri Mohd. Hamid Ansari with the 25 Students of St. Stephens College, University of Delhi, along with Principal (Revd. Valson Thampu), in New Delhi on March 06, 2009

Revd. Valson Thampu is an Indian educator, Christian theologian, who was the Principal of St Stephen's College, University of Delhi, Delhi, from 2008 to February 2016. Prior to this he was a lecturer at the college and its officiating principal since May 2007. He is a translator from Malayalam to English and his translation of The Scent of the Other Side won the Crossword award. His second translated work, Gift in Green was published by HarperCollins in 2011.

Prior to that he served as a Member of the Delhi Minorities Commission for two terms (2000 -2004) and Member, the National Commission for Minority Educational Institutions (2004-2007). He was nominated twice to the National Integration Council under the category, 'Distinguished Citizens of India'.

He was a controversial figure during his tenure as Principal of St. Stephen's, with numerous calls for his removal (particularly from alumni, as well as from professors at the institution). Under his leadership, St. Stephen's rose in national estimation and came to be ranked first among all colleges in India, for all courses taught in St. Stephen's.

He is an ordained minister of Church of North India and a member of the National Minorities Commission and Delhi Minorities Commission.

Thampu pursued Ph.D. in theology from Sam Higginbottom Institute of Agriculture, Technology and Sciences.

In view of the irreversible spiritual degeneration that churches in India have suffered, he renounced his priesthood in 2016.

== Sexual abuse coverup and controversy ==
In 2015, a researcher at St. Stephens College alleged Valsan Thampu of covering up sexual abuse and misconduct. She said that Thampu tried "to destroy her" by getting her to put on paper that her complaint was an "academic problem." Thampu, is also accused of forcing the rape victim to withdraw her complaints by "explaining the legal aspect" to her, and intimidating her. He is accused of blackmailing her so he would ensure her PhD would be completed as long as she cooperated and withdrew the complaint. On investigation by the police, it turned out that no case could be made out against the faculty member, who was 85% physically disabled, who was framed in this case. The facts about this and a host of controversies comprise the substance of Thampu's memoir titled On A Stormy Course (Hachette India, 2017).

== Works ==
- Kristiya drishtanta: a Christian viewpoint. with Kathleen D. Nicholls, Christopher Raj. Publisher: TRACI (Theological Research and Communication Institute), New Delhi, 1989.
- AIDS, heresy and prophecy: what the virus says. TRACI, New Delhi, 1993.
- The Word and the World: a Biblical perspective on contemporary issues. TRACI, New Delhi, 1995.
- Cross-cultural issues in AIDS: an Afro-Asian advocacy. TRACI, New Delhi, 1995.
- Rediscovering Mission: Towards a Non-western Missiological Paradigm. TRACI, New Delhi, 1995.
- Be thou my vision: spiritual resources for the healing ministry. TRACI, New Delhi, 1997. ISBN 8190085417.
- Religion and politics: minorities and the regeneration of the mainstream. Media House, 1999. ISBN 8174950567.
- Pilgrims to the light: encounters in a shared destiny. Har-Anand Publications, 2000. ISBN 8124106436. Ed. Excerpts
- Tongues of fire: Sermons for today. TRACI, New Delhi, 2001. ISBN 81-900854-3-3.
- Harvest of Hate: Gujarat Under Siege, with Swami Agnivesh. Rupa & Co, India. 2002. ISBN 81-7167-858-0.
- The Word and the World, TRACI, New Delhi, 2003.
- Othappu: The Scent of the other side, OUP, 2009.
- The Dream and the Dragon, TRACI, New Delhi, 1994.
- Gift in Green" HarperCollins, Delhi, 2011
- Bible: The Armour of Light, Delhi, 1996.
- Hidden Treasures. Delhi, 2005
- On A Stormy Course: In the Hot-seat at St. Stephen's. Hachette, India, 2017.
- The Saint of Parumala: A Tribute. Kottayam, 2017.
- Thoughts for Trying Times, Mumbai, 2021.
- Beyond Religion: Imaging A New Humanity. Pippa Rann Books & Media, UK, 2022. ISBN 978-1-913738-96-9
