= 1909 in literature =

This article contains information about the literary events and publications of 1909.

== Events ==
- January – T. E. Hulme's poems "Autumn" and "A City Sunset" are included in the Poets' Club anthology For Christmas MDCCCCVIII, as the first examples of Imagism.
- January 15 – Filippo Tommaso Marinetti's drama La donna è mobile opens at the Teatro Alfieri, Turin.
- February 1 – The first issue appears of La Nouvelle Revue Française, a literary magazine founded in Paris by André Gide, Jacques Copeau, Jean Schlumberger, Gaston Gallimard, and others.
- February 20 – Filippo Tommaso Marinetti's Futurist Manifesto first appears in the French newspaper Le Figaro.
- March 2 – Katherine Mansfield, while pregnant by another man, marries the singing teacher George Bowden, whom she barely knows. She leaves him the same evening to resume lesbian relations with Ida Baker.
- April
  - The opening night of Filippo Tommaso Marinetti's drama Le Roi bombance (The Feasting King, written 1905) is heckled by the audience and the writer himself.
  - The German periodical Die Tat is founded by Ernst Horneffer.
- April 24 – The Metropolitan Library (京师图书馆, Jīngshī Túshūguǎn) in Beijing, predecessor of the National Library of China, is founded by the Qing government.
- September 6 – Israel Zangwill's play The Melting Pot opens in New York City.
- September 23 – Gaston Leroux's novel The Phantom of the Opera (Le Fantôme de l'Opéra) begins serialization in the Paris newspaper Le Gaulois.
- September 29 – Franz Kafka's short story "The Aeroplanes at Brescia (Die Aeroplane in Brescia)", based on a real event, is published in the Prague newspaper Bohemia, as the first description of airplanes in German literature.
- November – A production by Kaoru Osanai of Henrik Ibsen's John Gabriel Borkman at the Free Theater in Tokyo inaugurates shingeki drama in Japan.
- November 2 – First English-language performance of a play by Anton Chekhov opens, The Seagull, translated and directed by George Calderon, by the Glasgow Repertory Theatre company at the Royalty Theatre, Glasgow.
- unknown date – Babelstornið (The Tower of Babel), by Rasmus Rasmussen, writing as Regin í Líð, becomes the first Faroese language novel to be published.

== New books ==
=== Fiction ===
- Florence Barclay – The Rosary
- Maurice Barrès – Colette Baudoche
- André Billy – La Derive
- Algernon Blackwood
  - The Education of Uncle Paul
  - Jimbo: A Fantasy
- René Boylesve – La Jeune Fille bien élevée (The Well-raised Girl)
- Hall Caine – The White Prophet
- Gilbert Cannan – Peter Homunculus
- Ion Luca Caragiale – Kir Ianulea
- Robert W. Chambers – The Danger Mark
- Herbert Croly – The Promise of American Life
- Em Kol Chai (Chava Shapiro) – Kovetz Tziurim (קבץ ציורים, A Collection of Sketches)
- Concha Espina – That Luzmela Girl
- Charles Hoy Fort – The Outcast Manufacturers
- Anatole France – Balthazar
- Jacques Futrelle – Elusive Isabel
- John Galsworthy – Fraternity
- Charles Garvice – A Fair Impostor
- Robert Hichens – Bella Donna
- Olha Kobylianska – V Nediliu Rano Zillia Kopala (She Gathered Herbs on Sunday Morning)
- Alfred Kubin – Die andere Seite (The Other Side)
- Maurice Leblanc – The Hollow Needle
- Gaston Leroux – Le fauteuil hanté (The Haunted Chair)
- Jack London – Martin Eden
- John Masefield – Multitude and Solitude
- Silas Weir Mitchell – The Red City
- Baroness Orczy
  - The Nest of the Sparrowhawk
  - The Old Man in the Corner
- Randall Parrish – My Lady of the South
- Eden Phillpotts – The Haven
- Luigi Pirandello – I vecchi e i giovani (The Old and the Young, part 1)
- Władysław Reymont – Chłopi (The Peasants; publication completed)
- Stein Riverton – Jernvognen (The Iron Carriage)
- Olivia Shakespear – Uncle Hilary
- Gertrude Stein – Three Lives
- Gene Stratton-Porter – A Girl of the Limberlost
- Hermann Sudermann – The Song of Songs
- Mark Twain – Captain Stormfield's Visit to Heaven (book publication)
- Edgar Wallace
  - Captain Tatham of Tatham Island
  - The Duke in the Suburbs
- Robert Walser – Jakob von Gunten
- Mary Augusta Ward – Daphne
- H. G. Wells
  - Ann Veronica
  - Tono-Bungay
- Mabel Osgood Wright – Poppea of the Post Office

=== Children and young people ===
- L. Frank Baum
  - The Road to Oz
  - Aunt Jane's Nieces at Work (as Edith Van Dyne)
- Angela Brazil – The Nicest Girl in the School
- Lucy Maud Montgomery – Anne of Avonlea
- Beatrix Potter
  - The Tale of the Flopsy Bunnies
  - The Tale of Ginger and Pickles
- P. G. Wodehouse – Mike

=== Drama ===
Poster by Oskar Kokoschka advertising the première of his play

- Paul Armont and Nicolas Nancey – Théodore et Cie
- Sem Benelli – The Jester's Supper (La cena delle beffe)
- Clyde Fitch – The City
- John Galsworthy – Strife
- Harley Granville-Barker – The Madras House
- Cicely Hamilton – A Pageant of Great Women
- Agha Hashar Kashmiri – Khwab-e-Hasti (The Dream World of Existence)
- Oskar Kokoschka – Murderer, the Hope of Women (Mörder, Hoffnung der Frauen)
- Else Lasker-Schüler – Die Wupper (published)
- André de Lorde – L'horrible expérience
- Gregorio Martínez Sierra – La sombra del padre (Shadow of the Father)
- Ferenc Molnár – Liliom
- Quintero brothers – El patinillo
- George Bernard Shaw – The Shewing-Up of Blanco Posnet

=== Poetry ===
- Guillaume Apollinaire – L'Enchanteur pourrissant (The Putrifying Enchanter)
- François Mauriac – Les Mains jointes (Clasped Hands)
- John Millington Synge – Poems and Translations

=== Non-fiction ===
- Henry James – Italian Hours
- William James – A Pluralistic Universe
- Jane's All the World's Aircraft (first annual edition)
- I. M. E. Blandin – History of Higher Education of Women in the South, Prior to 1860
- Alfred W. Pollard – Shakespeare Folios and Quartos: a Study in the Bibliography of Shakespeare's Plays, 1594–1685
- C. I. Scofield (ed.) – Scofield Reference Bible
- Charlotte Fell Smith – John Dee, 1527–1608
- Eraclie Sterian – În noaptea nunții (On Your Wedding Night)
- A. E. Waite – The Hidden Church of the Holy Graal
- Alice Zimmern – Women's Suffrage in Many Lands

== Births ==
- January 20 – Mae Virginia Cowdery, African American poet (died 1953)
- January 18 – Oskar Davičo, Serbian novelist and poet (died 1989)
- January 29 – Phoebe Hesketh (Phoebe Rayner), English poet (died 2005)
- February 15 – Miep Gies (Hermine Santruschitz), Austrian-born biographer (died 2010)
- February 24 – August Derleth, American anthologist (died 1971)
- March 6 – Stanisław Jerzy Lec, Polish aphorist and poet (died 1966)
- March 17 – Margiad Evans, Anglo-Welsh poet, novelist and illustrator (died 1958)
- March 22 – Gabrielle Roy, French Canadian author (died 1983)
- March 28 – Nelson Algren, American novelist (died 1981)
- March 31 – Robert Brasillach, French author (died 1945)
- April 8 – John Fante, American novelist (died 1983)
- May 1 – Yiannis Ritsos, Greek poet (died 1990)
- May 5 – Miklós Radnóti, Hungarian poet (died 1944)
- May 9 – Robert Garioch, Scottish poet (died 1981)
- June 6 – Isaiah Berlin, German-born philosopher (died 1997)
- June 19 – Osamu Dazai (太宰 治), Japanese author (died 1948)
- June 28 – Eric Ambler, English spy novelist (died 1998)
- June 29 – C. Hamilton Ellis, English writer (died 1987)
- July 1 – Juan Carlos Onetti, Uruguayan writer (died 1994)
- July 8 – Petar Šegedin, Croatian diplomat, novelist and essayist (died 1998)
- July 17 – G. P. Wells, English zoologist, son and co-author of H. G. Wells (died 1985)
- July 28 – Malcolm Lowry, English novelist (died 1957)
- July 29 – Chester Himes, American writer (died 1984)
- July 30 – C. Northcote Parkinson, English historian and author (died 1993)
- August 3 – Walter Van Tilburg Clark, American novelist (died 1971)
- August 11 – Uku Masing, Estonian religious philosopher, linguist and writer (died 1985)
- August 19 – Jerzy Andrzejewski, Polish author (died 1983)
- September 9 – Noel Barber, British novelist (died 1988)
- October 24 – Sheila Watson (Sheila Doherty), Canadian novelist and critic (died 1998)
- November 12 – Laxmi Prasad Devkota, Nepali poet, playwright, and novelist (died 1959)
- November 26 – Eugène Ionesco (Eugen Ionescu), Romanian-born French playwright (died 1994)
- November 27 – James Agee, American writer (died 1955)
- December 7 – Alexandru Talex, Romanian journalist, critic and biographer (died 1998)
- December 14 – Ronald Welch (Ronald Oliver Felton), Welsh novelist and children's writer writing in English (died 1982)
- December 16 – Edgar Mittelholzer, Guyanese novelist (suicide 1965)

== Deaths ==
- January 1 – Mollie Evelyn Moore Davis, American poet, writer, and editor (born 1844)
- January 14 – William à Beckett, English journalist (born 1844)
- January 22 – Hattie Tyng Griswold, American author (born 1842)
- February 11 – Russell Sturgis, American art critic (born 1836)
- March 24 – John Millington Synge, Irish dramatist and poet (born 1871)
- March 27 (probable) – John Davidson, Scottish poet (born 1857)
- April 9
  - Francis Marion Crawford, American novelist (born 1854)
  - Paschal Grousset, French journalist and science fiction writer (born 1844)
- April 12 – Algernon Charles Swinburne, English poet (born 1837)
- April 21 – Denys Corbet, Guernsey poet writing in Guernsey French and English (born 1826)
- April 26 – Marcus Dods, Scottish theologian (born 1834)
- May 18 – George Meredith, English novelist and poet (born 1828)
- June 11 – Jacob Mikhailovich Gordin, American dramatist (born 1853)
- June 24 – Sarah Orne Jewett, American writer (born 1849)
- July 8 – Albert Craig (The Surrey Poet), English cricket writer (born 1850)
- July 9 – Rosa Nouchette Carey, English children's writer (born 1840)
- August 15 – Euclides da Cunha, Brazilian writer, shot (born 1866)
- August 18 – Theodore Martin, Scottish-born writer (born 1816)
- August 21 – George Cabot Lodge, American poet (born 1873)
- August 23 – Liu E (劉鶚, Liu O), Chinese scholar, entrepreneur and novelist (born 1857)
- August 26 – George Manville Fenn, English novelist and educationalist (born 1831)
- September 4 – Clyde Fitch, American playwright (born 1865)
- September 19 – József Borovnyák, Slovene writer, politician and priest (born 1826)
- October 16 – Jakub Bart-Ćišinski, Upper Sorbian poet, writer, playwright and translator (born 1856)
- October 24 – Henry Charles Lea, American historian (born 1825)
- November 5 – H. L. Fischer, Pennsylvania German-language writer and translator (born 1822)
- November 18 – Renée Vivien, English-born French-language Symbolist poet (born 1877)
- December 14 – Frederick Greenwood, English novelist and journalist (born 1830)

== Awards ==
- Chancellor's Gold Medal: Dennis Holme Robertson
- Nobel Prize in Literature: Selma Lagerlöf (first female recipient)
- Newdigate Prize: Frank Ashton-Gwatkin
- Knighthood: Arthur Wing Pinero
- Prix Goncourt: Marius-Ary Leblond, En France
