= 1772 in literature =

This article contains information about the literary events and publications of 1772.

== Events ==
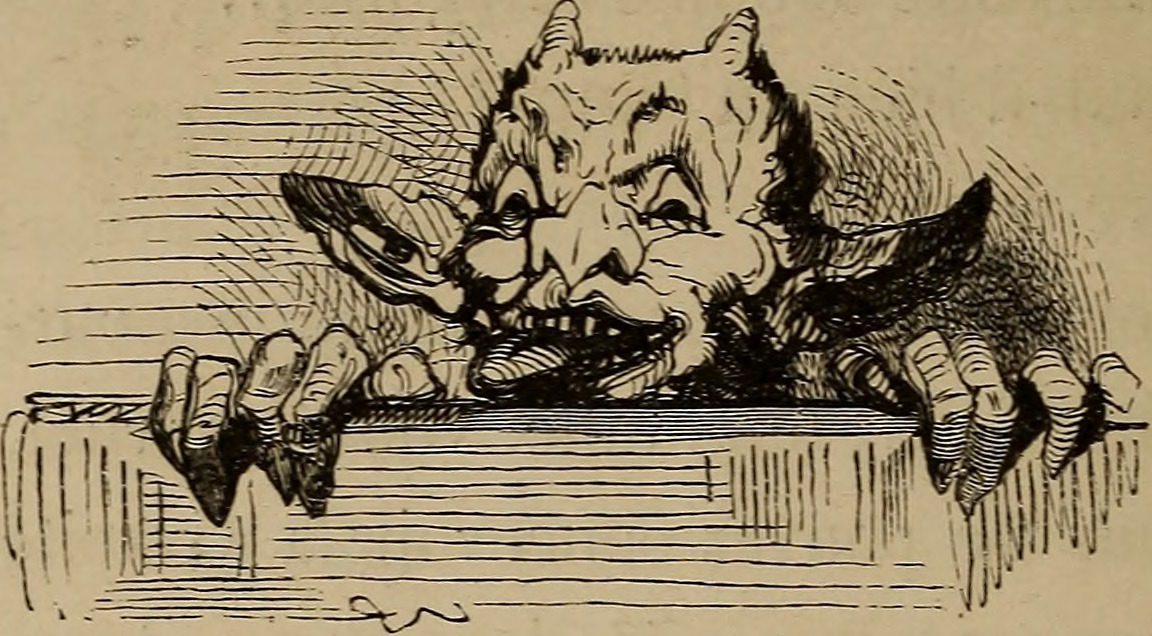
Image of demon in the novel The Devil in Love

- March – Gottfried August Bürger obtains a magistracy and is reconciled with his family.
- May 7 – The Stadsschouwburg theatre in Amsterdam is destroyed by fire.
- June
  - In June 1772, Marquis de Sade and his manservant, Latour, traveled to Marseilles on the pretext of obtaining a loan. On June 27, they engaged in an elaborately staged orgy with four prostitutes. The orgy included sexual intercourse, flagellation, and, according to some witnesses, both active and passive anal sex involving Sade, Latour and one of the prostitutes. Sade offered the prostitutes aniseed-flavored pastilles laced with Spanish fly. One of the prostitutes, Marianne Laverne, became ill after eating the pastilles. That evening, Sade had sex with another prostitute, Marguerite Coste, who became critically ill after eating the pastilles. Coste filed a complaint with the police and, after an investigation, a warrant was issued for the arrest of Sade on charges of both sodomy and poisoning.
  - Charles Burney tours Europe, researching for his History of Music.
- September 12 – The Göttinger Hainbund of German poets is formed at a midnight ritual in an oaken grove.
- November 10 – The wife of poet Pedro Correia Garção obtains an order for his release from prison, the very day of his death.
- November 28 – Publication of the Bible in the Manx language is completed.
- unknown dates
  - Thomas Paine produces his first published work, a political article entitled Case of the Officers of Excise.
  - Hannah More arrives in London.
  - An Armenian language press is set up in Chennai, India.

== New books ==
=== Fiction ===
- Elizabeth Bonhôte – The Rambles of Mr Frankly, Published by his Sister
- Jacques Cazotte – The Devil in Love
- Robert Fergusson – The Daft Days
- Sarah Scott – The Test of Filial Duty
- David Williams – Letter to David Garrick

=== Drama ===
- György Bessenyei – Ágis tragédiája
- Richard Cumberland – The Fashionable Lover
- Samuel Foote – The Nabob
- Vicente Garcia de la Huerta – Raquel
- David Garrick – The Irish Widow
- Gotthold Lessing – Emilia Galotti
- Louis-Sébastien Mercier
  - Le faux ami (The False Friend)
  - Jean Hennuyer, évêque de Lisieux (written)
- Arthur Murphy – The Grecian Daughter

=== Poetry ===
- Mark Akenside – Poems
- Thomas Chatterton – The Execution of Sir Charles Bawdin
- William Jones – Poems, Consisting Chiefly of Translations from the Asiatick Languages
- William Kenrick – Love in the Suds
- William Mason – The English Garden
- Christopher Smart – Hymns, for the Amusement of Children
- George Alexander Stevens – Songs

=== Non-fiction ===
- Alphabetum grandonico-malabaricum sive samscrudonicum (with a preface by Giovanni Cristofano Amaduzzi)
- The Encyclopédie in 28 volumes by Diderot, d'Alembert, and many others
- Moses Browne – The Excellency of the Knowledge of Jesus Christ
- José Cadalso – Los eruditos a la violeta
- William Chambers – A Dissertation on Oriental Gardening
- Junius (possibly Philip Francis) – Junius: Stat Nominis Umbra
- Francis Grose – The Antiquities of England and Wales
- Johann Gottfried Herder – Abhandlung über den Ursprung der Sprache (Treatise on the Origin of Language)
- Richard Hurd – An Introduction to the Study of Prophecies...
- Carsten Niebuhr – Beschreibung von Arabien
- Joseph Priestley – The History and Present State of Discoveries Relating to Vision, Light, and Colours
- Francis Stoughton Sullivan (died 1766) – An Historical Treatise on the Feudal Law, and the Constitution and Laws of England
- Catherine Talbot – Essays on Various Subjects
- Wilhelm Abraham Teller – Wörterbuch des Neuen Testamentes zur Erklärung der christlichen Lehre (Dictionary of the New Testament for the Explanation of Christian Doctrine)

== Births ==
- January 15 – James Ballantyne, Scottish editor and publisher (died 1833)
- March 10 – Karl Wilhelm Friedrich Schlegel, German poet, literary critic, philosopher and philologist (died 1829)
- April 11 – Manuel José Quintana, Spanish poet (died 1857)
- May 2 – Novalis (Georg Philipp Friedrich Freiherr von Hardenberg), German poet and philosopher (died 1801)
- August 29 – Sarah Burney, English novelist (died 1844)
- September 27 – Sándor Kisfaludy, Hungarian poet (died 1844)
- October 21 – Samuel Taylor Coleridge, English poet (died 1834)
- November 17 – Marc-Antoine Madeleine Désaugiers, French dramatist (died 1827)
- November 28 – Johann Gottfried Jakob Hermann, German classical commentator and philologist (died 1848)
- December 6
  - John Carr, English travel writer and lawyer (died 1832)
  - Henry Cary, Gibraltar-born Irish author, editor and translator (died 1844)
- unknown date – Maria Riddell, West Indies-born poet, naturalist and travel writer resident in Scotland (died 1808)
- probable – Charlotte Dacre, English Gothic novelist (died 1825)

== Deaths ==
- March 26 – Charles Pinot Duclos, French novelist and encyclopedist (born 1704)
- March 29 – Emanuel Swedenborg, Swedish philosopher (born 1688)
- May 22 – Durastante Natalucci, Italian historian (born 1687)
- June – Thomas Whately, English politician and writer (born 1726)
- June 18 – Johann Ulrich von Cramer, German philosopher (born 1706)
- October 7 – John Woolman, American abolitionist author (smallpox, born 1720)
- October 10 – William Wilkie, Scottish poet (ague, born 1721)
- November 10 – Pedro Correia Garção, Portuguese poet (born 1724)
- unknown dates
  - Thomas Hawkins, English editor and cleric (born 1729)
  - Margareta Momma, Swedish editor and writer (born 1702)

== Sources ==
- Lever, Maurice (1993). Marquis de Sade, a biography. Translated by Goldhammer, Arthur. London: Harper Collins. ISBN 0-246-13666-9.
- Schaeffer, Neal (2000). The Marquis de Sade: a Life. New York City: Knopf Doubleday. ISBN 978-0-67400-392-7.
