= 1844 in literature =

This article contains information about the literary events and publications of 1844.

== Events ==
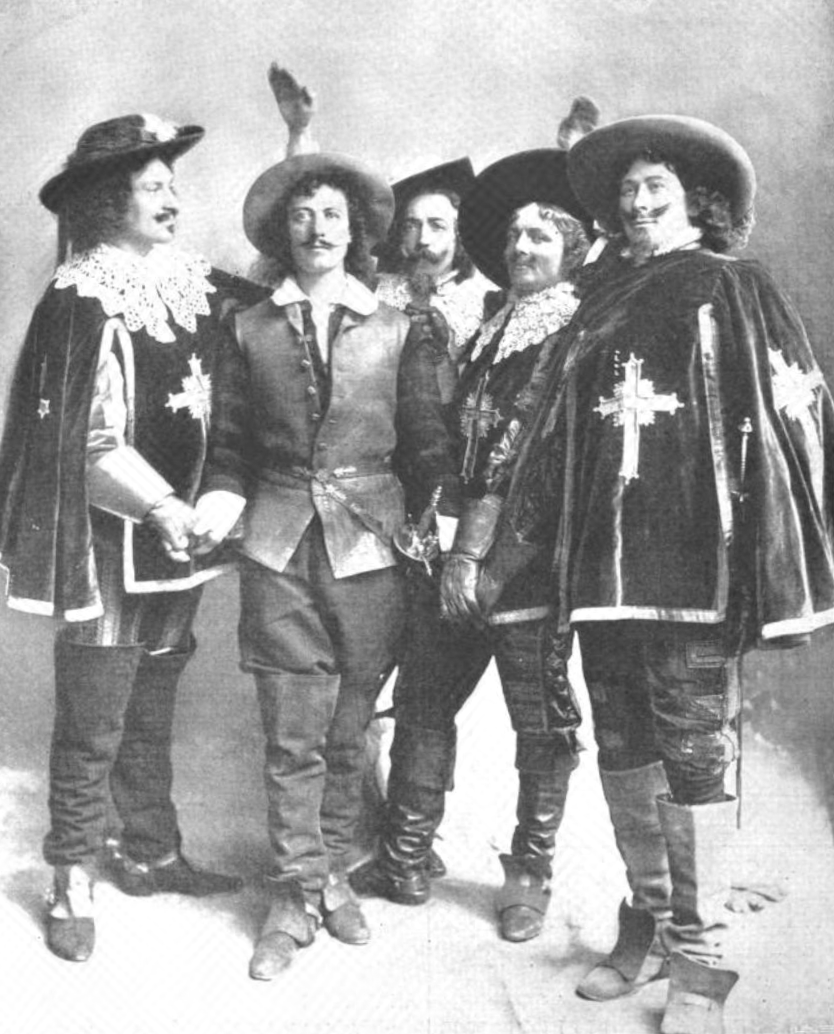
1898 production of The Three Musketeers at the Theatre Metropole

- January 4 – Swedish-language newspaper Saima, founded by J. V. Snellman, is published for the first time, in Finland.
- February 5 – The first three of many theatrical adaptations of A Christmas Carol open in London.
- March–July – Alexandre Dumas père's historical adventure story The Three Musketeers (Les Trois Mousquetaires) is serialised in the Paris newspaper Le Siècle.
- August 28 – Alexandre Dumas père's near-recent historical adventure story The Count of Monte Cristo (Le Comte de Monte-Cristo) begins serialization in the Paris newspaper Journal des débats, and continues through to January 1846. Book publication also begins this year.
- October – George W. M. Reynolds begins publication of the bestselling "penny dreadful" city mysteries series The Mysteries of London.
- Autumn – Margaret Fuller joins Horace Greeley's New-York Tribune as literary critic, becoming the first full-time female book reviewer in American journalism.
- December 2 – Emily Brontë writes the poem "A Death-Scene".
- unknown date – The first volumes of Patrologia Latina, a 217-volume collection of works in Latin, are published in Paris by Jacques Paul Migne. These include the writings of Tertullian and Cyprian, among other authors.

== New books ==
=== Fiction ===
- William Harrison Ainsworth – St. James's
- José de Alencar – Os contrabandistas (unpublished, lost)
- Honoré de Balzac – Les Paysans
- Charles Dickens
  - The Chimes
  - Martin Chuzzlewit (serial publication ends)
- Benjamin Disraeli – Coningsby
- Alexandre Dumas
  - The Count of Monte Cristo
  - The Three Musketeers
- Charles Lever – Tom Burke of Ours
- Joaquim Manuel de Macedo – A Moreninha
- Edgar Allan Poe – short stories
  - "The Angel of the Odd"
  - "The Premature Burial"
- G. W. M. Reynolds – The Mysteries of London
- Eugène Sue – The Wandering Jew (Le Juif Errant)
- William Makepeace Thackeray – The Luck of Barry Lyndon
- Charlotte Elizabeth Tonna – The Wrongs of Women
- Charlotte Mary Yonge – Abbeychurch, or, Self Control and Self Conceit

=== Children and young people ===
- Hans Christian Andersen – New Fairy Tales. First Volume. Second Collection (Nye Eventyr. Første Bind. Anden Samling) comprising "The Fir-Tree" ("Grantræet") and "The Snow Queen" ("Snedronningen")
- Heinrich Hoffmann – Struwwelpeter
- Frederick Marryat – Settlers in Canada
- Elizabeth Missing Sewell – Amy Herbert

=== Drama ===
- Émile Augier – La Ciguë
- Dimitrija Demeter – Teuta
- Gustav Freytag – Die Brautfahrt, oder Kunz von der Rosen
- Catherine Gore – Quid Pro Quo
- Christian Friedrich Hebbel – Maria Magdalene
- William H. Smith – The Drunkard
- José Zorilla – Don Juan Tenorio

=== Poetry ===
- Elizabeth Barrett Browning – Poems
- Lydia Maria Child – "Over the River and Through the Wood"
- Heinrich Heine – Neue Gedichte
- James Russell Lowell – Poems
- Coventry Patmore – Poems

=== Non-fiction ===
- Robert Chambers (anonymously) – Vestiges of the Natural History of Creation
- Joseph Ennemoser – Geschichte der Magie (History of Magic)
- Søren Kierkegaard (as Vigilius Haufniensis) – The Concept of Anxiety (Begrebet Angest)
- Karl Marx – "On the Jewish Question" ("Zur Judenfrage")
- John Stuart Mill – Essays on Some Unsettled Questions of Political Economy
- William Smith (editor) – Dictionary of Greek and Roman Biography and Mythology
- Arthur Penrhyn Stanley – Life of Arnold
- Max Stirner – The Ego and Its Own (Der Einzige und sein Eigentum)
- Henry Fox Talbot – The Pencil of Nature (first book illustrated with photographs from a camera)

== Births ==
- January 2 – Emeline Harriet Howe, American writer and social activist (died 1934)
- January 8 – Sarah Carmichael Harrell, American educator, reformer, and writer (died 1929)
- January 14 – Susan F. Ferree, American writer and activist (died 1910)
- February 25 – Alice Diehl (née Mangold), English novelist and concert pianist (died 1912)
- March 19 – Minna Canth, Finnish writer and social activist (died 1897)
- March 30 – Paul Verlaine, French lyric poet (died 1896)
- April 2 – George Haven Putnam, American author, publisher (died 1930)
- April 16 – Anatole France, French writer (died 1924)
- April 12 – Mollie Evelyn Moore Davis, American poet, writer, and editor (died 1909)
- May 9 – Sarah Newcomb Merrick, American teacher, writer, and physician (unknown year of death)
- June 28 – John Boyle O'Reilly, Irish-born poet, journalist and fiction writer (died 1890)
- July 8 – Janet Milne Rae, Scottish novelist (died 1933)
- July 21 – Matilda Maranda Crawford, American-Canadian writer and poet (died 1920)
- July 22 – William Archibald Spooner, English academic and instigator of spoonerisms (died 1930)
- July 28 – Gerard Manley Hopkins, English poet (died 1889)
- August 29 – Edward Carpenter, English socialist poet and philosopher (died 1929)
- September 9 – Maurice Thompson, American novelist (died 1901)
- October 1 – H. Maria George Colby, American author of novelettes and juvenile literature (died 1910)
- October 6 – Margret Holmes Bates, American novelist and poet (died 1927)
- October 15 – Friedrich Nietzsche, German philosopher (died 1900)
- October 22 or 23 – Sarah Bernhardt, French actress (died 1923)
- October 23
  - Robert Bridges, English poet (died 1930)
  - Laura Rosamond White, American author, poet, editor (died 1922)
- October 25 – Joseph Marmette, Canadian novelist and historian (died 1895)
- October 27 – Klas Pontus Arnoldson, Swedish writer and pacifist (died 1916)
- November 21 – Ada Cambridge, English/Australian writer and poet (died 1926)
- December 13 – Catharine H. T. Avery, American author, editor, and educator (died 1911)
- December 27 – Lisa Anne Fletcher, American poet and correspondent (died 1905)
- unknown dates
  - Mrs. Lovett Cameron (Caroline "Emily" Sharp), English romantic novelist (died 1921)
  - Evelyn Whitaker, English children's writer (died 1929)

== Deaths ==
- January 4 – Maria Hack, English educational writer (born 1777)
- January 27 – Charles Nodier, French novelist (born 1780)
- February 11 – Tamenaga Shunsui, Japanese novelist (born 1790)
- February 12 – Jan Nepomuk Štěpánek, Czech dramatist (born 1783)
- May 2 – William Thomas Beckford, English novelist and travel writer (born 1760)
- June 11 – Urban Jarnik, Slovene poet and historian (born 1784)
- June 15 – Thomas Campbell, Scottish poet (born 1777)
- July 11 – Evgeny Baratynsky, Russian poet and philosopher (born 1800)
- August 14 – Henry Cary, Gibraltar-born Irish author and translator (born 1772)
- September 18 – John Sterling, Scottish novelist and poet (born 1806)
- October 28 – Sándor Kisfaludy, Hungarian poet and dramatist (born 1772)
- November 4 – Barbara Hofland, English children's and schoolbook author (born 1770)
- November 21 – Ivan Krylov, Russian fabulist (born 1769)
- December 27 – John Caradja, Greek Prince of Wallachia, translator and theatrical promoter (asthma, born 1754)

== Awards ==
- Chancellor's Gold Medal – Edward Bickersteth, "The Tower of London"
- Newdigate Prize – Evgeny Baratynsky
