= Cherupaithangal =

Malayalam book

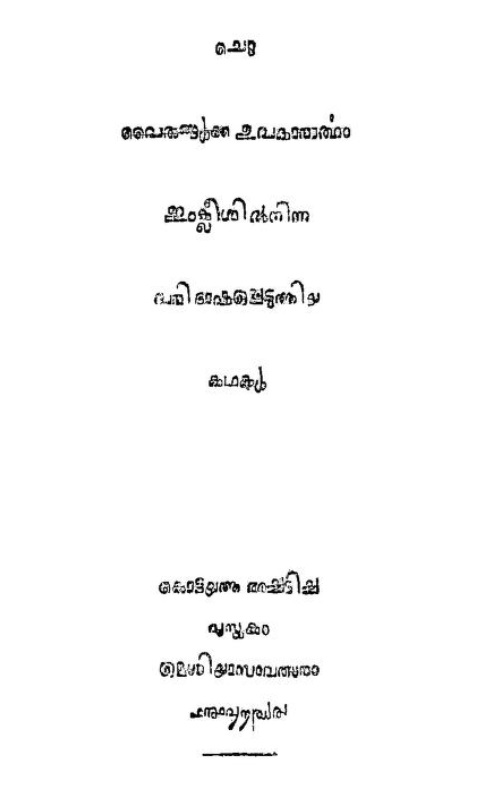
Title page of Cherupaithangal the first Malayalam book ever to be printed in Kerala

Cherupaithangal (Malayalam: ചെറുപൈതങ്ങൾ. Full title: ചെറുപൈതങ്ങൾക്ക ഉപകാരാർത്ഥം ഇംക്ലീശിൽനിന്ന പരിഭാഷപ്പെടുത്തിയ കഥകൾ) is the first Malayalam book ever to be printed in Kerala. It is not the Malayalam book ever to be printed. The first Malayalam book ever to be printed is Samkṣepavedārththham authored by Clemente Peani and printed in Rome in 1772. Cherupaithangal is a collection of seven stories for children translated from English by the British missionary Benjamin Bailey and printed in C. M. S. Press, Kottayam in 1824. It is also the first book in Malayalam that could be categorized as children's literature. The existence of this book was long forgotten and, in modern times, it was brought to public awareness by George Irumbayam, an Indian literary critic and literature researcher, in June 2024. The digital version of the book was made publicly available by Kerala Sahitya Akademi on 8 February 2014.

== The seven stories ==
The following are rough English translations of the titles of the seven stories in the book.

1. The story of a four year old girl named Marjari from England (എംഗലാന്തിൽമാൎജ്ജരിഎന്നപെരായിനാല വയസ്സചെന്ന ഒരു പെൺപൈതലിന്റെ കഥാ)
2. The story of a knowledgeable child (ജ്ഞാനിപൈതലിന്റെ കഥാ)
3. The story of lamps (ആട്ടിൻകുട്ടികളുടെ കഥാ)
4. The story of fortitude in adversity (വിപദി ധൈൎയ്യം ഒരു കഥാ)
5. The story of George and his wheel (ജൊൎജ്ജിന്റെയുംഅവന്റെചക്രത്തിന്റെയും കഥാ)
6. History of King Edward VI (എഡ്വാൎഡ എന്ന പെർഉളവായരാജാക്കന്മാരിൽ ആറാമവന്റെ ചരിതം)
7. The meaning of mental strength (മനസ്സുറപ്പിന്റെ സംഗതി)
8. The story of Theophilus and Savio (തെയൊഫിലുസിന്റെയും സൊവ്യായുടെയും കഥാ)

== Full text ==
The full text of the book is available for free download in Internet Archive at the link Cherupaithangal.

== See also ==
- Samkshepa Vedartham (the first Malayalam book ever to be printed)
