= Bessenyei =

Bessenyei is a Hungarian surname. Notable people with the surname include:

- Ferenc Bessenyei (1919–2004), Hungarian actor and singer
- György Bessenyei (1747–1811), Hungarian playwright and poet
