= Benjamin Bailey (missionary) =

British missionary (1791-1871)

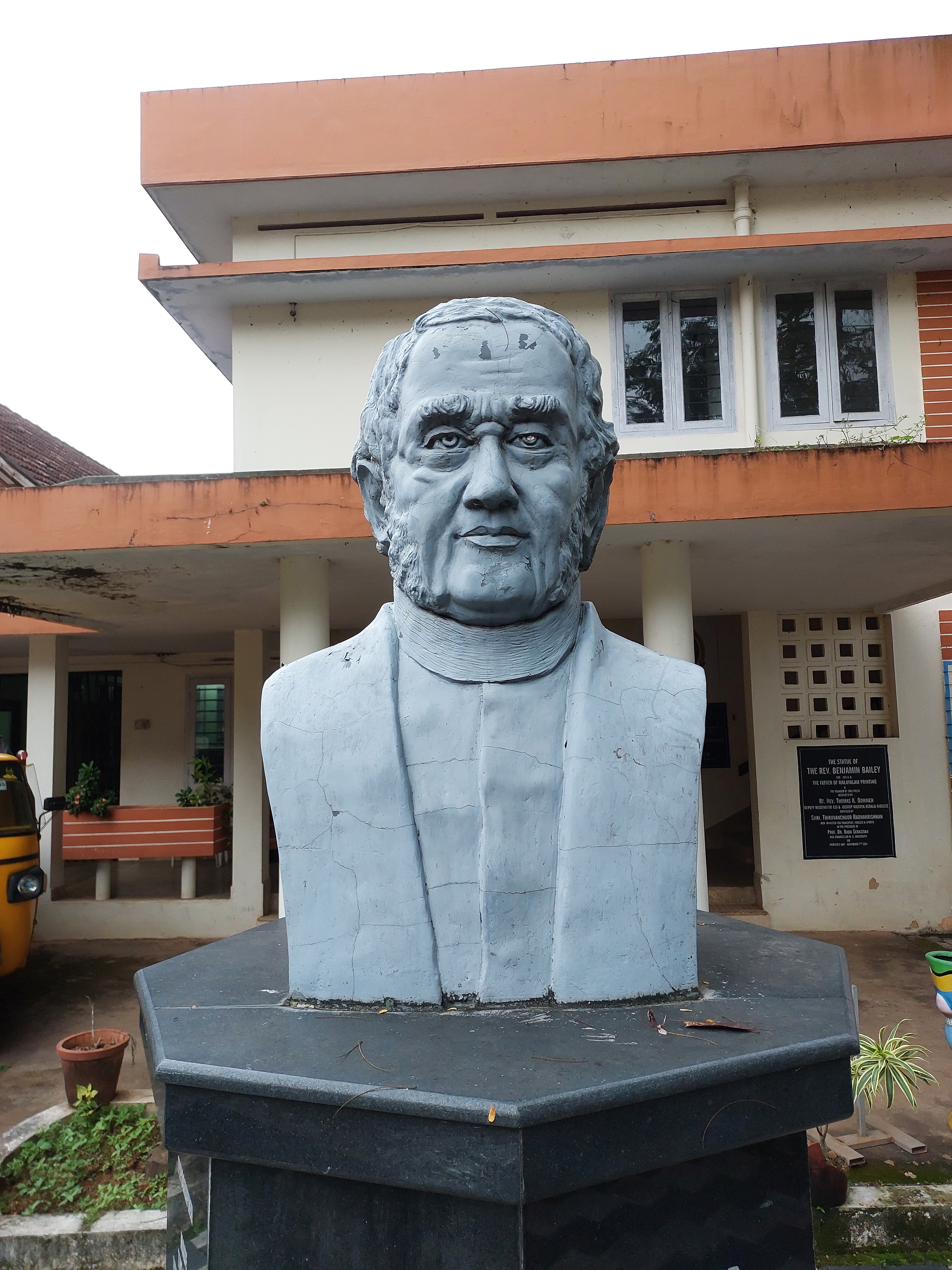
- Born: Benjamin Bailey; November 1791; Dewsbury, West Yorkshire, England
- Died: 3 April 1871 (aged 79); Sheinton, Shropshire, England
- Known for: Translating Bible into Malayalam language, Standardized the Malayalam types, Compiled the first Dictionary in Malayalam, first principal of CMS College, Kottayam
- Spouse: Elizabeth Ella

Benjamin Bailey (November 1791 in Dewsbury – 3 April 1871 in Sheinton, Shropshire, England) was a British Church Mission Society missionary in Kerala, India for 34 years. He was ordained 1815 and moved to Kerala in 1816 where he found a mission station in Kottayam, and in 1821 he established a Malayalam printing press. He translated the Bible into Malayalam, in 1846 published the first English-Malayalam dictionary, and in 1849 published the first Malayalam-English dictionary.

== Life ==
Benjamin Bailey was born in November 1791, as the son of Joseph Bailey and his wife Martha. 1812, two years under Rev. T. Scott for missionary training; one year under J. Buckworth, Vicar of Dewsbury. He was ordained as Deacon on 6 August and as Priest on 17 December 1815, by the Archbishop of York (to the Curacy of Harewood, West Yorkshire). In 1816, he married Elizabeth Ella and, on 4 May that year, went to Kottayam, Kerala, India.

Benjamin Bailey was the progenitor of printing and book publishing in Malayalam, the native language of Kerala. It was he who established the first printing press (the Kottayam CMS press) and started printing Malayalam in Kerala. He was the first lexicographer in the language. Besides this, he was a well versed author and translator. He compiled a dictionary of the Malayalam language.

Benjamin Bailey was also an architect in Gothic style. In 1839–42, he built the Anglican church in Kottayam-the Christ Church- which Bishop Wilson called "the glory of Travancore". The church is now the Cathedral church of the CSI Madhya Kerala Diocese.

On 14 May 1831 Benjamin Bailey went to England on furlough and returned to India on 15 July 1834. On 13 March 1850 he departed to England and retired owing to failure of health. From 1856 until his death he was Rector of Sheinton, Shropshire and in 1857 appointed Honorary Life Governor of the CMS. He was Rural Dean of Condover (in which Rural Deanery area his parish lay) from 1862 to his death.

He died suddenly at Sheinton on 3 April 1871, aged 79.

== Malayalam language printing ==
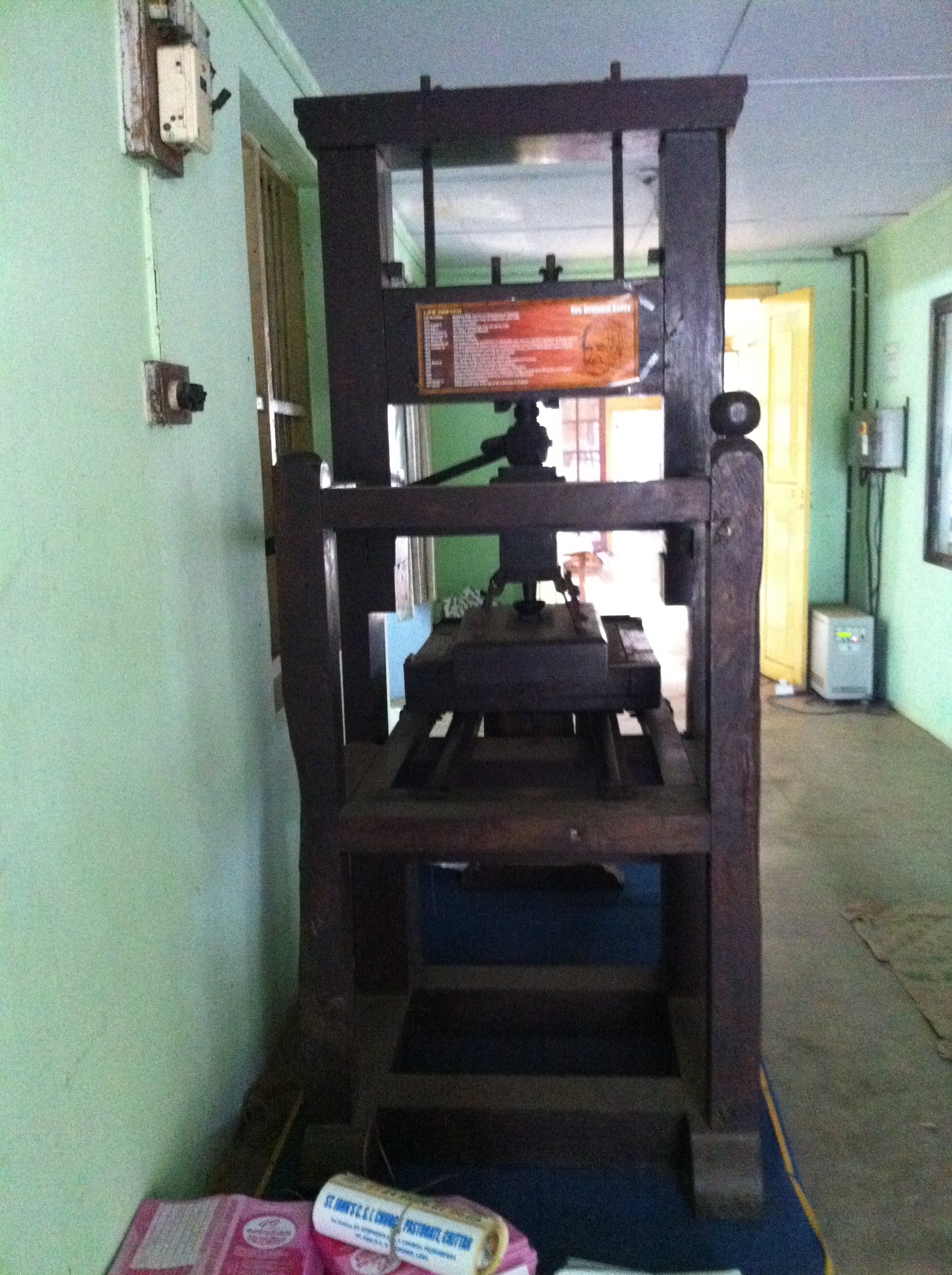
Benjamin Bailey's Printing Press at CMS Press, Kottayam, which was moved later to Benjamin Bailey Museum

Benjamin Bailey was the founder of both Malayalam printing and book publishing. The C.M.S. Press he established in 1821 at Kottayam was not only the first Malayalam printing office but also the first book publishing house. CMS Press undertook printing works in the languages of Malayalam, English, Tamil, Sanskrit, Latin and Syriac-simply, CMS Press was the first polyglot printing office in Kerala. Printing led to the publishing of books and periodicals. He translated the New Testament from Greek into Malayalam.

== See also ==
- Cherupaithangal

== Gallery ==
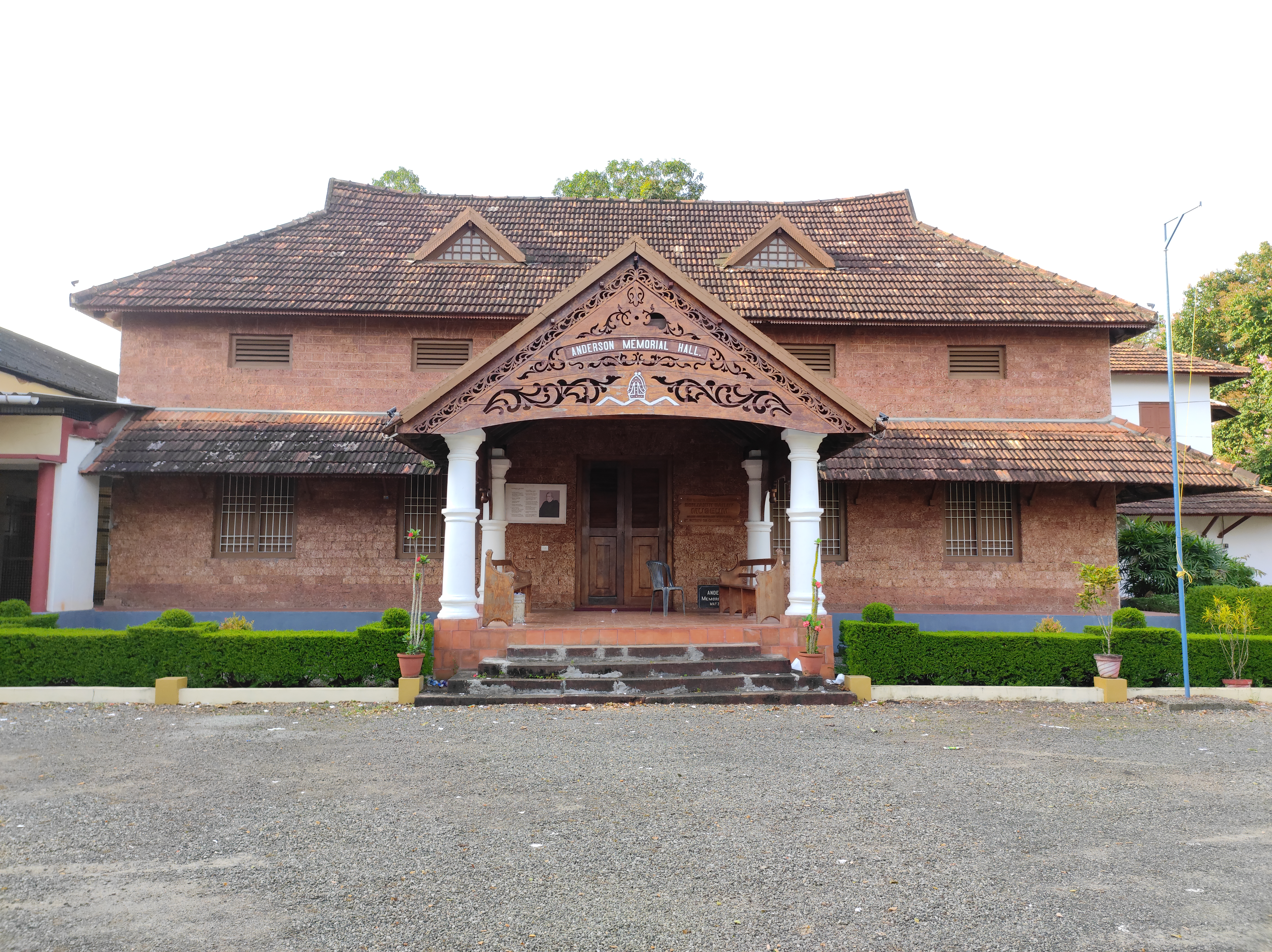
Benjamin Bailey Museum, Kottayam

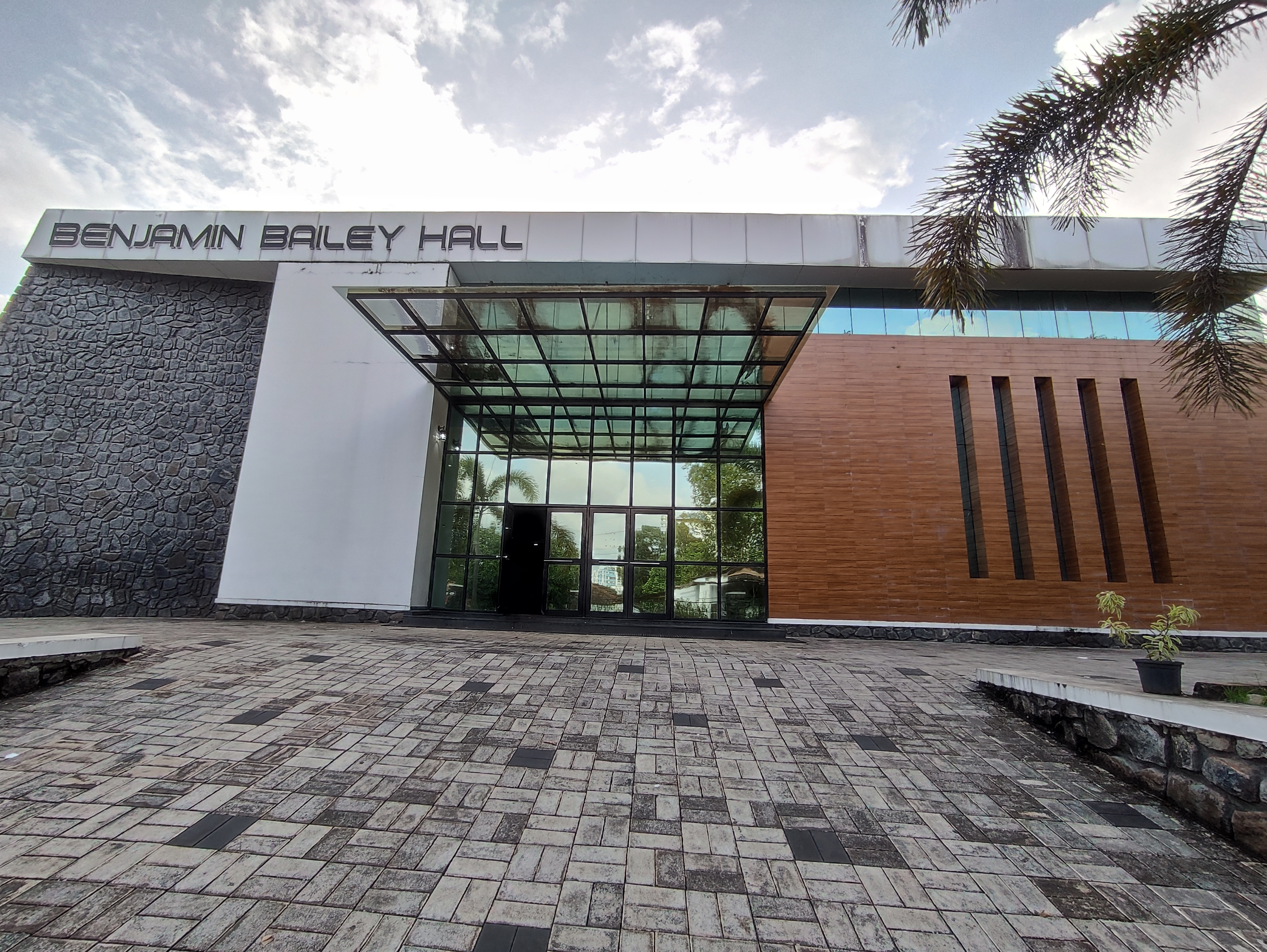
Benjamin Bailey Hall, Kottayam. Memorial for Bailey

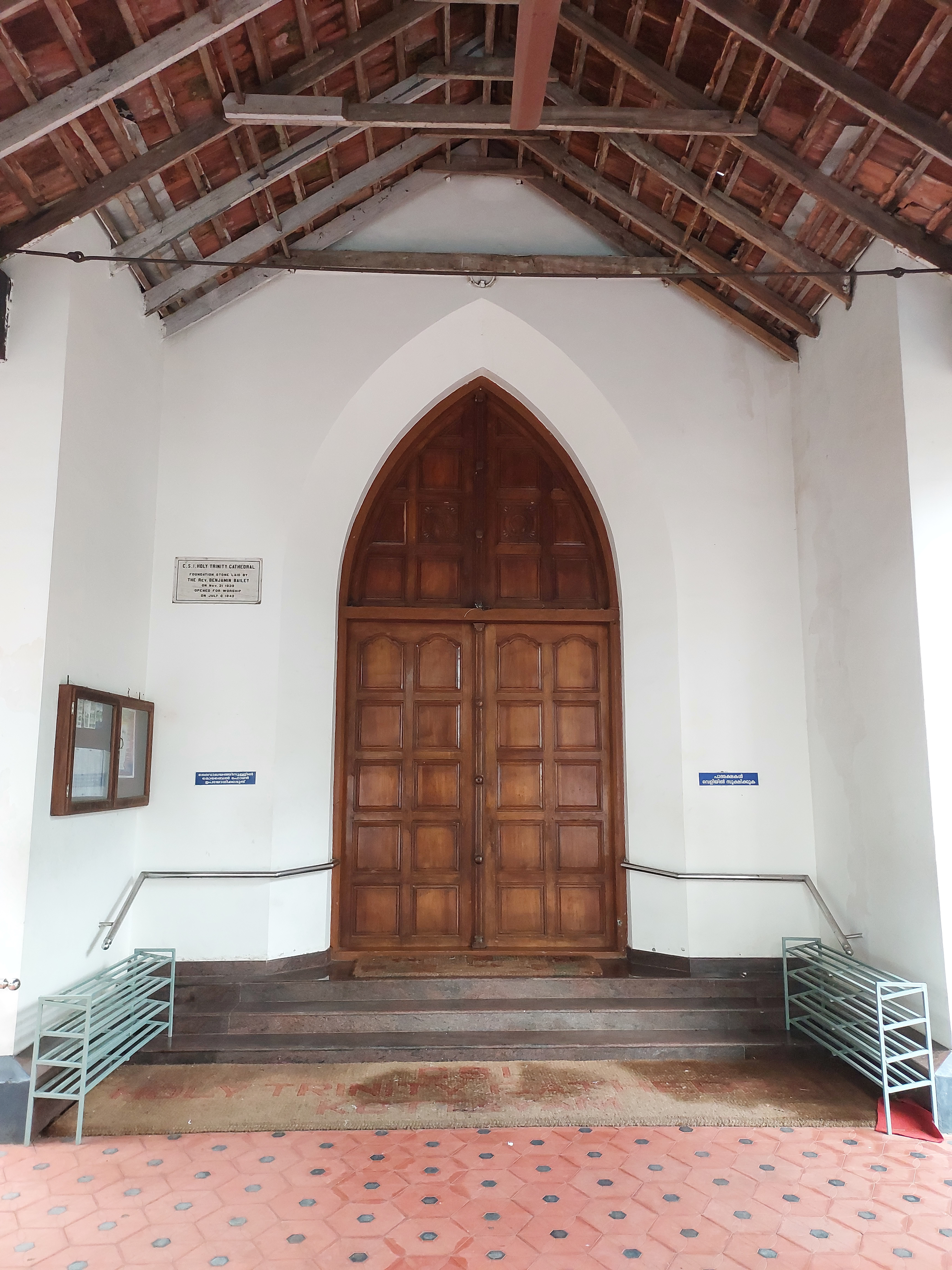
The west door of Holy Trinity Cathedral which mentions Bailey laid the foundation stone in 1839

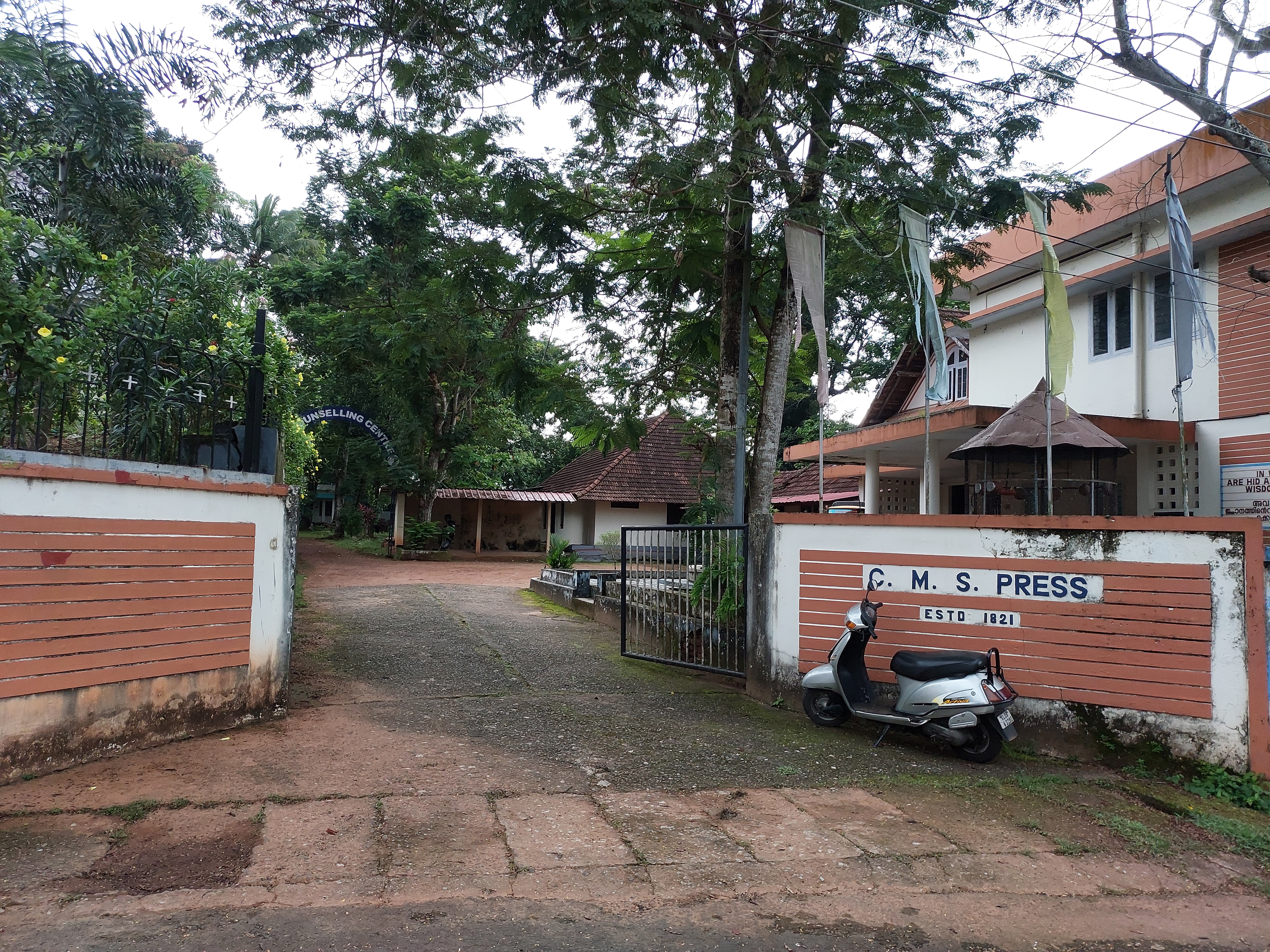
C.M.S. Press

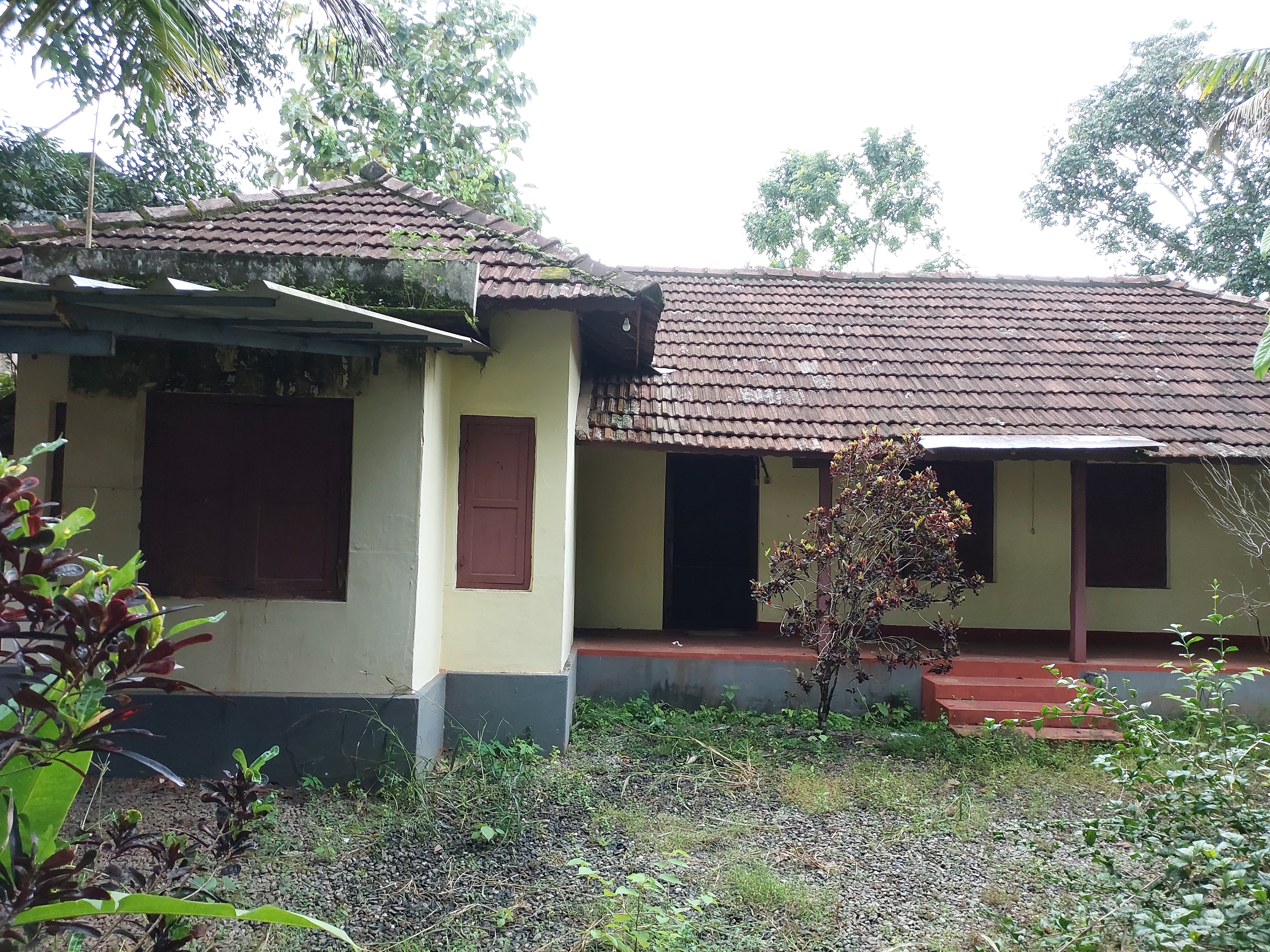
Bailey Bhavan, Kottayam
