= Sheinton =

Village in Shropshire, England

Coordinates: 52.632°N 2.576°W

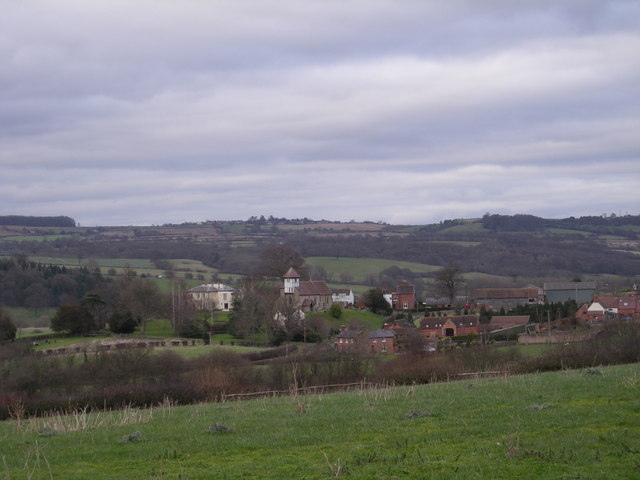
- Sheinton

- Location within Shropshire
- Population: 135 (2011)
- OS grid reference: SJ610039
- Civil parish: Sheinton
- Unitary authority: Shropshire
- Ceremonial county: Shropshire
- Region: West Midlands
- Country: England
- Sovereign state: United Kingdom
- Post town: SHREWSBURY
- Postcode district: SY5
- Dialling code: 01952
- Police: West Mercia
- Fire: Shropshire
- Ambulance: West Midlands
- UK Parliament: Shrewsbury and Atcham

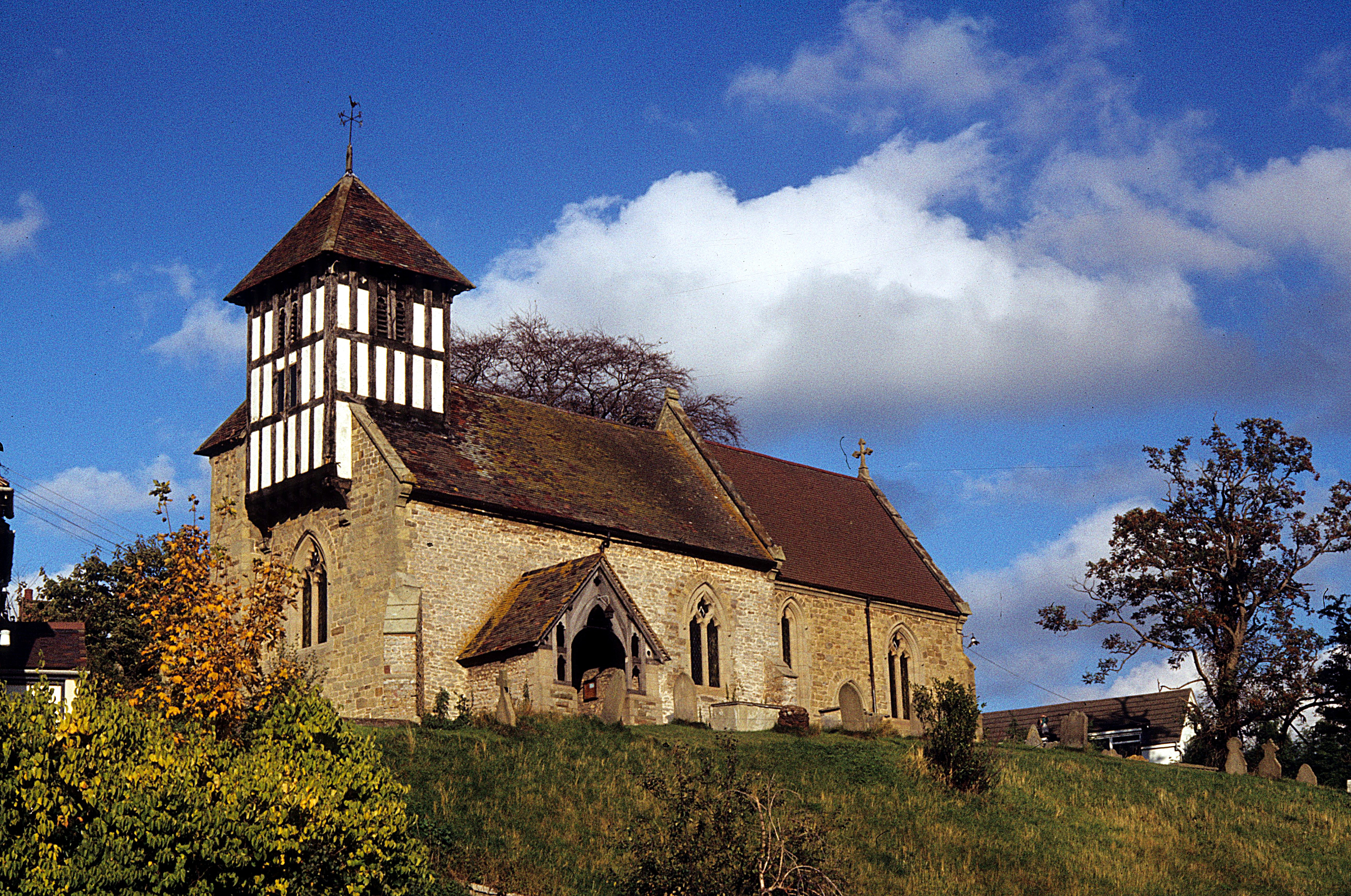
Church of St. Peter and St. Paul, Sheinton.

Sheinton is a small rural village and civil parish just outside Telford, and within Shropshire.

It is situated on the south bank of the River Severn opposite the Wrekin, a notable Shropshire landmark.

== Etymology ==
The name comes from the Saxon shena – tun, meaning "beautiful place".

== The Village ==
The village is small and has a large amount of agricultural land. The soil is mainly sand and loam however the more elevated parts are mostly strong clay. The parish council is combined with the neighbouring parish of Cressage. The population of Sheinton, according to the 2001 census, was 273.

=== Amenities ===
There are limited services in Sheinton village, however there are many facilities such as pubs and restaurants, hotels, shops and cinemas, schools and a doctor's surgery close by in the neighbouring village of Cressage and town of Much Wenlock. The nearest railway stations are Wellington (5.40 miles) and Telford Central railway station (6.60 miles).

=== St Peter and Paul's Church ===
St Peter and Paul's church is a Grade II* listed building. Standing high on a natural mound overlooking the Seven Valley this medieval church was restored and altered in the 19th century. The church was partly rebuilt in the 1660s and later thoroughly restored in 1854.

The church contains a framed Roll of Honour on the north wall listing local men who served in World War I, and, on the opposite wall, a brass war memorial plaque to seven men who died serving in the same war.

== Sheinton Bridge ==
In October 2008, the Sheinton brook became a raging torrent after exceptionally heavy precipitation fell over Shropshire. The force of the water caused one of the supporting piers for the brick-built bridge to collapse across the brook. The collapse began on 23 October while engineers were repairing the damaged foundations; a crack was noticed along the structure minutes before it collapsed.

The bridge's collapse caused great disruption to local residents of Sheinton who faced inconvenient diversions to commute to and from the county town of Shrewsbury. However, Shropshire County Council acted quickly and a temporary road bridge and approaches were built in the fields alongside the old bridge. The damage caused to the old bridge was so extensive that repairing it was not an option. The two-pier bridge was listed, therefore it had to be redesigned in the same style, using the same type of materials, and listed building consent had to be obtained. The whole process took months and approval by the Environment Agency was needed.

== Climate ==
The closest weather station to Sheinton is located in Shawbury, which is the main weather station for the whole of Shropshire. The climate for Shropshire is very similar throughout, where locally the coldest nights around Shawbury fall to −9.6c.

Climate data for Sheinton, Shrewsbury, Shropshire
Month	Jan	Feb	Mar	Apr	May	Jun	Jul	Aug	Sep	Oct	Nov	Dec	Year
Mean daily maximum °C (°F)	7 (45)	7 (45)	10 (50)	12 (54)	16 (61)	19 (66)	21 (70)	21 (70)	18 (64)	14 (57)	10 (50)	7 (45)	14 (56)
Mean daily minimum °C (°F)	0 (32)	0 (32)	1 (34)	2 (36)	5 (41)	8 (46)	10 (50)	10 (50)	7 (45)	4 (39)	2 (36)	1 (34)	4 (40)
Average precipitation cm (inches)	5.48 (2.16)	4.11 (1.62)	4.53 (1.78)	4.64 (1.83)	5.42 (2.13)	5.43 (2.14)	5.18 (2.04)	5.69 (2.24)	5.88 (2.31)	6.18 (2.43)	6.08 (2.39)	6.10 (2.40)	64.72 (25.47)
Source: Bing.com

== Notable people ==
- Benjamin Bailey (1791–1871), British missionary, died as Rector of Sheinton

== See also ==
- Listed buildings in Sheinton
- Sheinton Street
