= Samkshepa Vedartham =

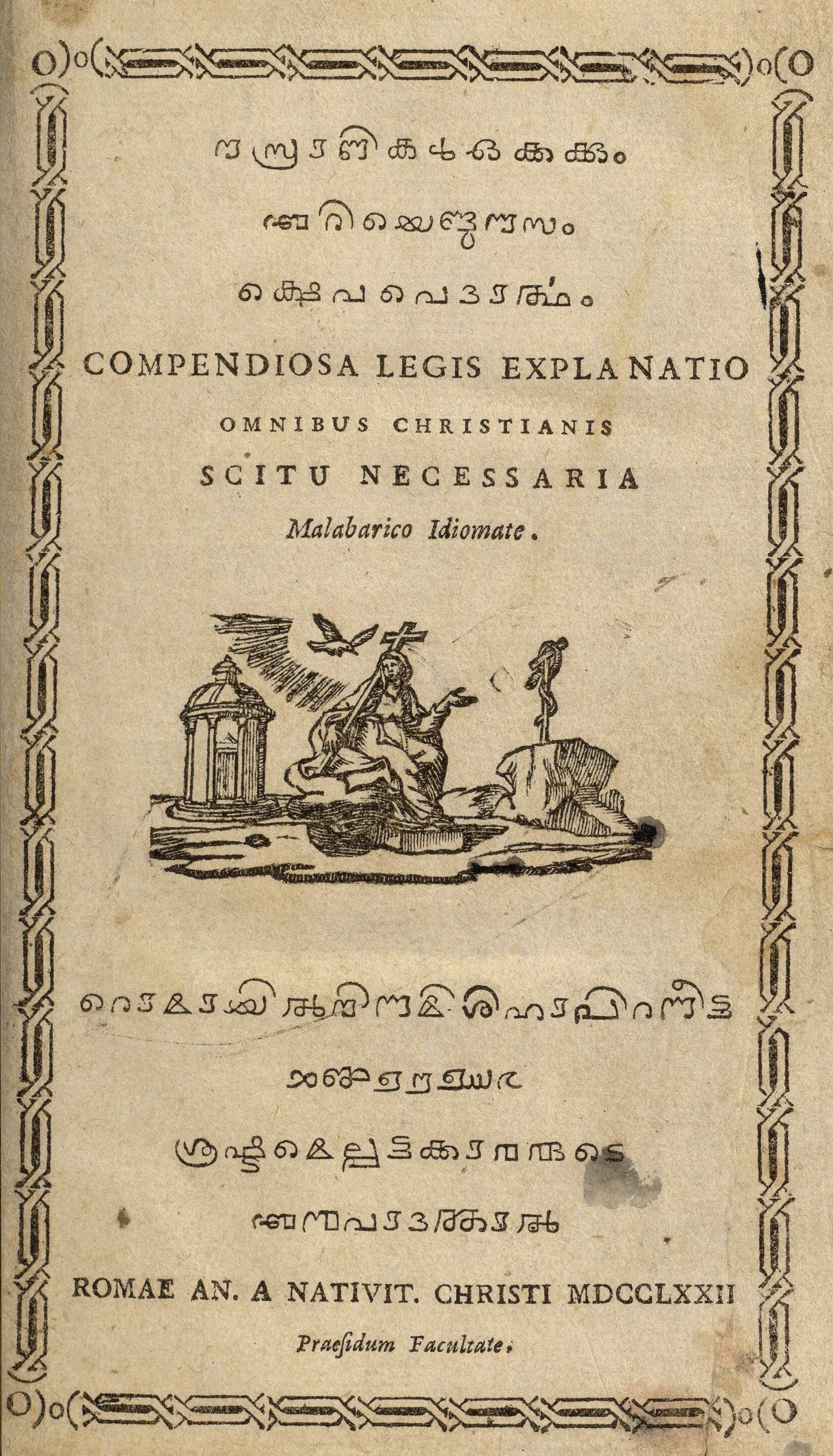
The cover page of Samkshepa Vedartham, printed in Rome in 1772, the first Malayalam book ever to be printed.

Samkshepa Vedartham (in Malayalam: സംക്ഷേപവേദാർത്ഥം; full title in Malayalam: നസ്രാണികൾ ഒക്കേക്കും അറിയേണ്ടുന്ന സംക്ഷേപവേദാർത്ഥം; full title in Latin: Compendiosa legis explanatio omnibus Christianis scitu necessaria Malabarico idiomate) is the first book in Malayalam language ever to be printed. Malayalam language is one of the 22 scheduled languages of India, is spoken by at least 35 million people in India and has been designated as a classical language of India. Samkshepa Vedartham is basically a catechism book written in the question-answer format. It was authored by Clemente Peani (1731–1782), also known as Clemens Peanius, who was a member of the Congregation for the Evangelization of Peoples who reached Kerala in 1757 and spent several years there as a Christian missionary. The book was printed in the year 1772 in Rome using movable types. Peanius had to cut as many as 1128 letter types for printing the book. Peani is also the author of another book titled "Alphabetum grandonico-malabaricum sive samscrudonicum" printed in Rome in 1772 dealing with the Malayalam alphabet. This latter book is a book written in Latin; it is not a book in Malayalam even though Malayalam characters and sentences appear in the book.

== The contents ==
The contents of Samkshepa Vedartham has been summarized thus:

"The divisions of the contents are made as groups, lessons and cantos. The book is in the form of a dialogue between a teacher and his student. The topics discussed touch the Cardinal principles and faith of Christianity and spirituality. The mystery of creation, life after death, the mystery of the Trinity and incarnation, mark of the cross, the Lord’s Prayer, doctrines of Christianity, the seven sacraments, purity and sinfulness, vespers etc. are explained by the author in their totality in a very easy-to-understand manner."

== A modern edition ==
A second edition of the Samkshepa Vedartham has been published jointly by D. C. Books, Kottayam and Carmel Publishing Centre, Thiruvananthapuram in 1980 with an introduction by Chummar Choondal and a commentary by Mathew Ulakanthara.

== A new Malayalam typeface ==
The typeface used in the first printing of Samkshepa Vedartham has inspired a few Malayalam typographers to design and construct a new modern typeface in Malayalam that closely resembles the Samkshepa Vedartham typeface.

== Full texts ==
- A digitized version of the full text of the original edition of Samkshepa Vedartham is available in the Internet Archive at the link HERE.
- The full text of Samkshepa Vedartham with modern Malayalm typeface is available in Malayalam Wikisource at the link HERE.
- A digitized version of Alphabetum grandonico-malabaricum sive samscrudonicum is available at the link HERE.

== See also ==
- Cherupaithangal (the first Malayalam book ever to be printed in a press in Kerala)
