= Listed buildings in Sheinton =

Sheinton is a civil parish in Shropshire, England. It contains nine listed buildings that are recorded in the National Heritage List for England. Of these, one is listed at Grade II*, the middle of the three grades, and the others are at Grade II, the lowest grade. The parish contains the village of Sheinton and the surrounding countryside. Most of the listed buildings are farmhouses, the others being a church, a cottage, a barn, a former mill, and a former rectory.

== Key ==
Grade	Criteria
II*	Particularly important buildings of more than special interest
II	Buildings of national importance and special interest

== Buildings ==
Name and location	Photograph	Date	Notes	Grade
Church of St Peter and St Paul; 52.63217°N 2.57685°W		14th century	The church was partly rebuilt in the 1660s, and restored in 1854 by S. Pountney Smith, when the north aisle was added. It is built in limestone with tile roofs, and consists of a nave, a south porch, a north stair turret, a north aisle with a lean-to, and a chancel. Corbelled out from the west end is a timber framed belfry that has a pyramidal roof and a brass weathercock.	II*
Leach Meadow Cottage; 52.63159°N 2.57353°W	—	Early 16th century (probable)	A farmhouse, later an inn, it has been extended and altered. The early part is timber framed with red brick and plaster infill, it is partly rebuilt in red brick, and has a tile roof. There is one storey and an attic, a two-bay hall range, and a later range at the rear.	II
The Buck; 52.63304°N 2.58460°W	—	Early 17th century (probable)	A cottage, at one time an inn, it was extended in the 19th century. It is in brick, encasing and partly replacing timber framing, and has a tile roof. There is one storey and an attic, a front range and a rear wing. On the front is a gabled porch, the windows are casements, and there are gabled eaves dormers.	II
Wood Farmhouse; 52.62238°N 2.54986°W	—	Early 17th century	The farmhouse, which was later altered, is timber framed with plastered and brick infill on a plinth of limestone and brick, with cladding in brick, and a slate roof. There is one storey and an attic, three bays, and lean-tos at the rear and on the right. The windows are casements, and there are two gabled eaves dormers.	II
Severn Springs Farmhouse and barns 52.62042°N 2.55277°W	—	Mid 17th century (probable)	The farmhouse and barns are timber framed with red brick infill, the barns on a limestone plinth, and they have tile roofs. The farmhouse has two storeys and two gabled eaves dormers. To the south are two threshing barns, each with four bays, and they contain threshing entrances.	II
Barn, Sheinton Hall Farm; 52.63196°N 2.57542°W		Late 17th century (probable)	The barn was later extended. It is timber framed with weatherboarding and a tile roof. There are three bays, and single-bay extensions at each end. In the middle bay is a sliding door.	II
Former mill 52.62117°N 2.56943°W	—	Late 18th century	The mill, now disused, is in red brick with a stepped eaves cornice and a tile roof. There are three levels, and segmental-headed openings in the lower two levels.	II
Sheinwood Farmhouse; 52.62000°N 2.56928°W	—	Late 18th century	The farmhouse is in red brick with a dentiled eaves cornice, and a hipped tile roof with a central well. There are three storeys, and fronts of three bays. Most of the windows are sashes with segmental heads, and the central doorway has a radial fanlight and a pediment. The southwest front contains casement windows and a doorway with a bracketed flat hood.	II
The Woodlands; 52.63248°N 2.57692°W	—	c. 1830	A rectory, later a private house, it is in brick, rendered on the front and the left, with a double-span hipped slate roof. There are two storeys, a front of three bays, the middle bay recessed, and a service range set back on the right. In the centre is a flat-roofed porch and a doorway with a radial fanlight. The windows are sashes, and in the left return are two canted bay windows.	II
