= The Aeroplanes at Brescia =

- Short story by Franz Kafka
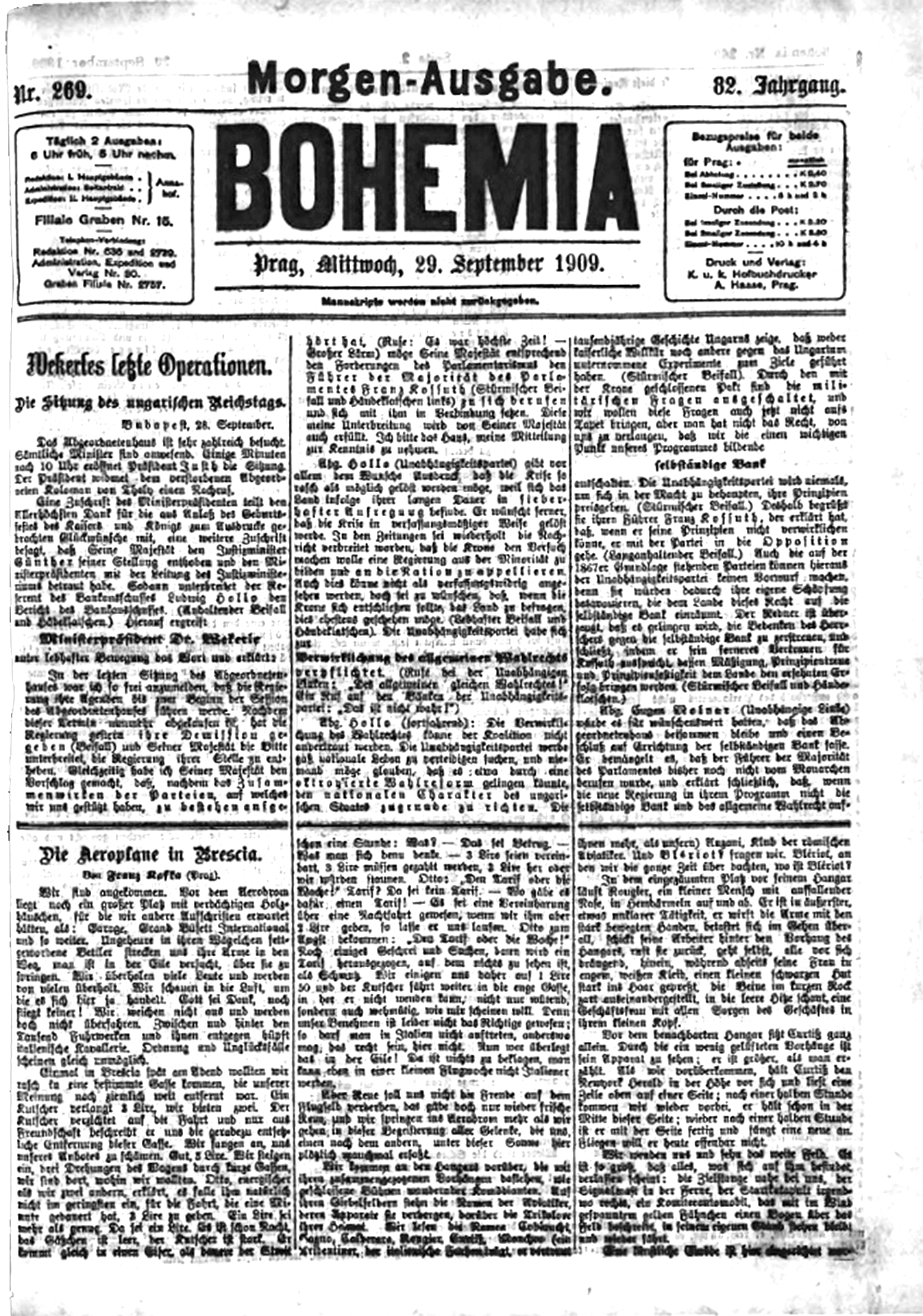
- Part of its publication in Bohemia, 29 September 1909
- Original title: Die Aeroplane in Brescia
- Language: German

Publication
- Published in: Bohemia
- Publication date: 29 September 1909

"The Aeroplanes at Brescia" (German: "Die Aeroplane in Brescia") is a short story by Franz Kafka published, in slightly shortened form, in the newspaper Bohemia on 29 September 1909. It describes an airshow near the Italian city of Brescia, which Kafka saw with two of his friends (Max and his brother Otto Brod) during their journey to Italy. Among other participants, they saw Louis Blériot, the aviator famous for the first flight across the English Channel. The story is lively and witty, as Kafka was fascinated by the airshow. It is also the first description of aeroplanes in German literature.

== Literature ==
Peter Demetz, The Air Show at Brescia, 1909 (Farrar, Straus and Giroux, New York 2002).
