= Marius-Ary Leblond =

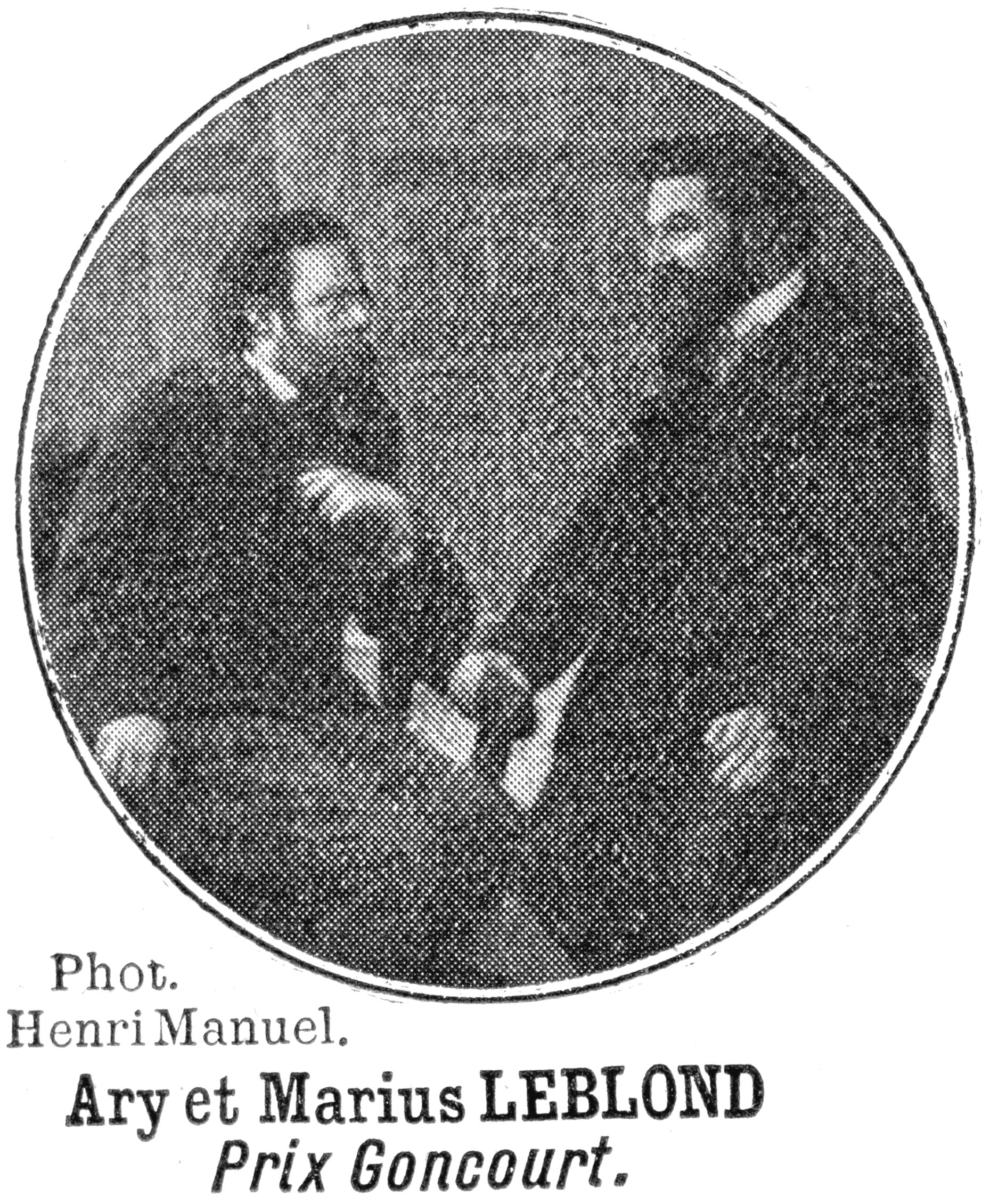
"Ary & Marius Leblond" by Henri Manuel

Marius-Ary Leblond is the pen name of two historians, writers, art critics and journalists, George Athénas and Aimé Merlo, cousins, from Réunion.

Their work was rewarded by the Prix Goncourt in 1909 for the novel En France, which narrates the journey of two young Creoles, who came to study at the Sorbonne.

They occupied public positions, (George) as secretary to Joseph Gallieni from 1914 to 1916, and (Aimé) as conservator of France overseas museums. They helped with the creation of the Musée Léon Dierx, in Saint-Denis de La Reunion.

== Works ==
- En France, novel, 1909.
- La France devant l'Europe, essay, 1913, Eugène Fasquelle Éditeur.
- Le Zézère, novel Fasquelle, 1903.
- Le Secret des Robes, novel in Algéria, Fasquelle.
- La Sarabande, novel, Fasquelle, 1904; rééditéd La Kermesse noire, novel, 1934.
- Les Sortilèges, novel Indian Océan, Fasquelle, 1905.
- L'Oued, novel, Fasquelle.
- Anicette et Pierre Desrades, novel, Fasquelle.
- Le Miracle de la Race, novel, Albin Michel; édition aux « Maîtres du Livre », chez Crès.
- L'Ophélia, novel, Crès.
- La Grande Île de Madagascar, à « La Vie ».
- Fétiches, contes de l'Océan Indien, Éditions du Monde Moderne.
- Ulysse, Cafre, novel, à « La Vie », 1924.
- Le Noël du Roi Mandjar, with 15 aquatints of Ary Leblond, édition à « La Vie ».
- Étoiles, Océan Indien, Ferenczi.
- Les Martyrs de la République Ferenczi et Fils:
  - I. La Guerre des Âmes,
  - II. L'Écartèlement,
  - III. La Damnation,
  - IV. La Grâce.
- Les Vies parallèles, novel, Fasquelle.
- La Métropole :
  - I. En France, novel, prix Goncourt.
  - II. Les Jardins de Paris, novel, Fasquelle.
- L'Amour sur la Montagne, novel, à « La Vie ».
- Nature, proses, dessins de George Bouche, Delpeuch.
- La Pologne Vivante, Perrin.
- La Société Française sous la Troisième République, Alcan.
- L'Idéal du XIXe Siècle.
- Galliéni parle..., 2 volumes, Albin Michel.
- Peintres de Races, studies on European Art, van Oest.
- Anthologie coloniale, morceaux choisis d'Écrivains français, J. Peyronnet et Cie, 1929.
