= Clemente Peani =

Clemente Peani (1731–1782), also known as Clemens Peanius and Clemens di Gesù, was a member of Congregatio de Propaganda Fide who was involved in the preparation of Alphabetum grandonico-malabaricum sive samscrudonicum, published in 1772 by the congregation's press. Clemente spent several years in Kerala where he devoted himself to mission work and a study of Malayalam, a Dravidian language. During a visit to Rome he cut and engraved a set of Malayalam types for the press.

== See also ==
- Samkshepa Vedartham
