= The Duke in the Suburbs =

1909 novel by Edgar Wallace

- Author: Edgar Wallace
- Language: English
- Genre: Comedy
- Publisher: Ward Lock
- Publication date: 1909
- Publication place: United Kingdom
- Media type: Print

The Duke in the Suburbs is a 1909 novel by the British writer Edgar Wallace.

Unusually for Wallace, best known for his heavy thrillers, it is a comedy about a Duke who goes to live in a street in the suburbs and the impact he has on the pretentious middle-class residents. It has been described as Wodehousian in style.

== Bibliography ==
- Sandra Kemp, Charlotte Mitchell & David Trotter. Edwardian Fiction: An Oxford Companion. Oxford University Press, 1997.
