= Bohemia (newspaper) =

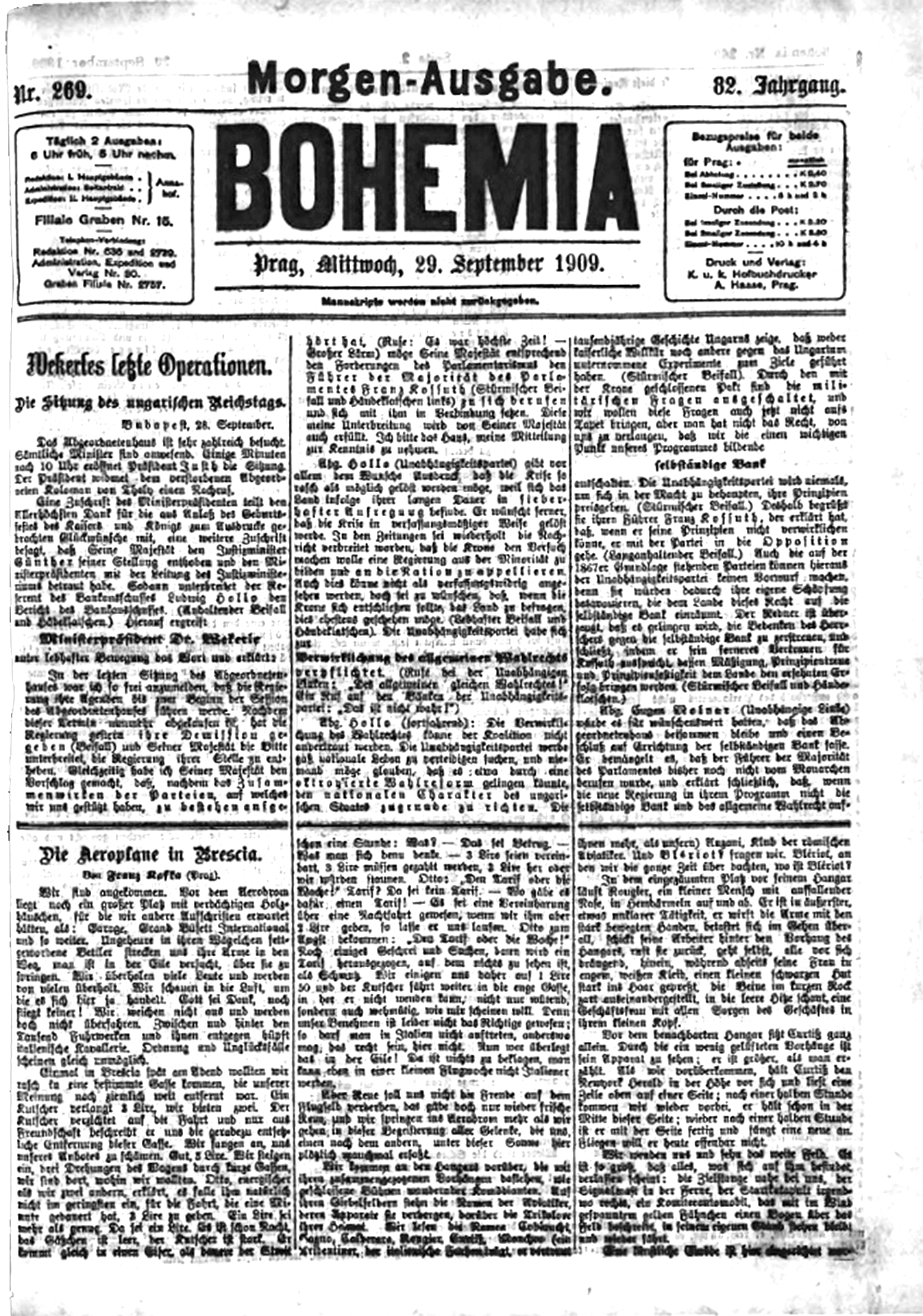
Title page, 29 September 1909, with Franz Kafka's article "Die Aeroplane in Brescia" ("The Aeroplanes at Brescia") below the fold

Bohemia was a German newspaper published in Prague from 1828 to 1938. After the restoration of constitutional government in 1861, it emerged as the main press organ of the German liberal political current (the so-called Constitutional Party) in Bohemia.

== History and profile ==
The paper started as a supplement of the weekly Prager Zeitung from 1828 to 1835 under various names: first as Unterhaltungsblätter, in 1830 as Bohemia oder Unterhaltungsblätter für gebildete Stände, in 1832 as Bohemia ein Unterhaltungsblatt, and finally in 1918 as Deutsche Zeitung Bohemia (German newspaper Bohemia). Famous writers for the newspaper included Franz Kafka, Egon Kisch, Hans Heinz Stuckenschmidt, and Johannes Urzidil.

The newspaper was printed by several companies:

- Gottlieb Haase & Sons (1828–1872)
- Bohemia Aktiengesellschaft (1872–1877)
- Frantisek Klutsack (1878)
- Andreas Haase (1879–1919)
- Alfred Korn (1919–1920)
- Verlag Deutsche Zeitung-Aktiengesellschaft (1920–1933)
- Rota-Aktiengesellschaft für Zeitung- und Buchdruck (1933–1938)

=== Aftermath ===
The newspaper's archives can be found in the National Library of the Czech Republic. From 2000, a German-Czech newspaper (Czech: Česko-Německé noviny Bohemia) took the name Bohemia, continuing the Deutsch-Tschechische Zeitung für gute Nachbarschaft (German-Czech newspaper of good neighbourhood).
