= Sarah Newcomb Merrick =

Canadian-American educator, writer, business woman, physician

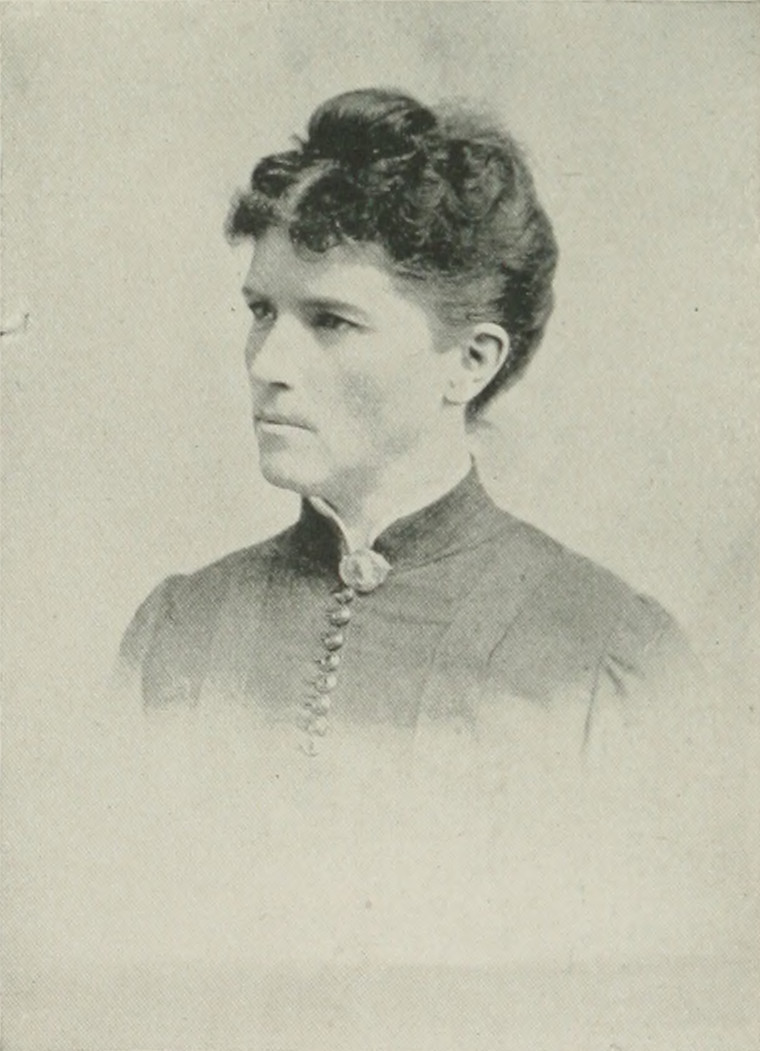
- Photo in A Woman of the Century
- Born: Sarah (or Sara) Julia Newcomb; May 9, 1844; Charlottetown, Prince Edward Island, Canada
- Died: February 3, 1922 (aged 77); Wellesley, Massachusetts, U.S.
- Education: Boston University School of Medicine
- Occupations: teacher; writer; business woman; inventor; physician
- Spouse: Morgan Wolfe Merrick (m. 1876)
- Children: Julia
- Relatives: Simon, William Brewster
- Writing career
- Language: English

Sarah Newcomb Merrick (née, Newcomb; May 9, 1844 – February 3, 1922) was a Canadian-born American teacher and writer. She was also a business woman and inventor before she became a physician later in life. She was the author of A Unique Method for Preserving the Inscriptions in our Historic Burial Grounds and Present-day Beliefs in Some Medical Superstitions. Her invention of a pen-holder to fit on the finger like a thimble to avoid hand cramps was patented in 1887.

== Early life and education ==
Sarah (or Sara) Julia Newcomb was born in Charlottetown, Prince Edward Island, Canada, on 9 May 1844. Her parents were John Burton Newcomb and Emily A. Prince. Her six siblings included, Simon (the astronomer), Thomas, Harriet, Richard, James, and John.

Merrick was a descendant of William Brewster, a Pilgrim. She counted among her ancestors some of the most notable New England names. She was a member of the Daughters of the American Revolution by virtue of her great-grandfather, Simon Newcomb, having, with others, instigated rebellion in Nova Scotia. The rebellion was quelled soon after Mr. Newcomb's death in 1776. Forty-one of his kinsmen avenged his death by taking an active part in the war in the New England and other States.

She was orphaned at the age of seven, which hampered the education she sought to become a school teacher. In her earliest childhood, she played at teaching, and when barely nine years of age, offered her services to a missionary as a teacher for the Mi'kmaq of Nova Scotia. In 1860, she reached the United States, and the following year, entered the public schools of Boston. Through the financial assistance of her oldest brother, she remained there till 1867, when she was graduated in the Girls' High and Normal School.

== Career ==
=== Teacher ===
Merrick's first teaching position was in Manassas, Virginia. There, she not only worked throughout the week, but on Sunday afternoon, lead the children in scripture lessons, illustrated on the blackboard. That drew the attention of a Baltimore clergyman, and he strongly urged her to leave teaching and take up divinity, assuring her of a license from the Baltimore Synod. She declined, and resolved that nothing should change her mind about her chosen field. Hearing of Texas as a new opportunity for teachers, she removed there and taught at the Freedmen's Bureau School for Colored Children. In September, 1872, she was appointed principal of Third Ward Colored School, a public school in San Antonio, a position she held for eighteen years.

On 14 August 1876, she married Morgan Wolfe Merrick (1839–1919), a surveyor and Confederate Army veteran. An infant son died before a daughter, Julia, was born in 1878. Even after marriage, she continued to teach. For over two years, Merrick was a paid contributor to the Texas School Journal, and it was through her work that San Antonio had the reputation of having the best primary schools in the State.

=== Writer and businesswoman ===
Writer's cramp affected her right hand around 1883. She then learned how to write with her left hand, while she was in the meantime perfecting her invention of a pen-holder to fit on the finger like a thimble to avoid hand cramps. It was patented in 1887. Her investments in real estate in San Antonio proved profitable, and Merrick was considered a good business woman. She was president of the Business Woman's Association after it was formed San Antonio. After retiring from active work in the school room around 1890, she intended to continue her work in the cause of education through her writing. In 1910, she published a biography about her father and brother, Simon, in McClure's.

=== Homeopath ===
In the mid-1890s, Merrick left her husband and returned to Boston, where she graduated in 1897 from Boston University School of Medicine. Four years later, she provided support for an antivivisection bill, and by 1903, she was a leader in Boston's antivaccinationist movement. She worked as a physician and pharmacist at the Roxbury Homeopathic Dispensary.

== Death ==
Sarah Newcomb Merrick died at Wellesley, Massachusetts, February 3, 1922.

== Selected works ==
- A Unique Method for Preserving the Inscriptions in our Historic Burial Grounds.
- Present-day Beliefs in Some Medical Superstitions.
