= Ágis tragédiája =

Ágis tragédiája is a Hungarian drama play, written by György Bessenyei. It was first produced in 1772.

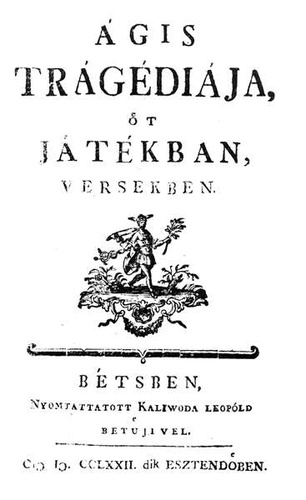
Ágis tragédiája

== Information ==
- www.theeuropeanlibrary.org
- www.arcanum.hu/hu/online-kiadvanyok
