= The Irish Widow =

1772 play

The Irish Widow is a play by David Garrick first staged at Drury Lane Theatre on 23 October 1772. It was written in less than a week by Garrick and resembled the plot of Le Mariage forcé by Molière. A comedy, it depicts an elderly man who falls in love with his nephew's fiancée, the young Irish Widow Brady, and uses his control over his nephew's inheritance to end the relationship setting off a chain of events. The play was a success and was performed frequently until the 1820s.

== Bibliography ==
- Stein, Elizabeth. David Garrick, Dramatist. The Modern Language Association of America, 1937.
- Wood, Edward Rudolf. Plays by David Garrick and George Colman the Elder. Cambridge University Press, 1982.
