= Italian Hours =

1909 travel book by Henry James

- First US edition
- Author: Henry James
- Language: English
- Genre: Travel writing
- Publisher: William Heinemann, London; Houghton Mifflin Company, Boston
- Publication date: Heinemann: 28 October 1909; Houghton: 24 November 1909
- Publication place: United Kingdom, United States
- Media type: Print
- Pages: Heinemann: 364; Houghton: 505

Italian Hours is a book of travel writing by Henry James published in 1909. The book collected essays that James had written over nearly forty years about a country he knew and loved well. James extensively revised and sometimes expanded the essays to create a more consistent whole. He also added two new essays and an introduction.

== Summary and themes ==
Italian Hours ends with the phrase, "the luxury of loving Italy," and everything in the book indicates that James enjoyed this luxury to the fullest. But he was by no means a blind lover. His opening essay on Venice, for instance, doesn't gloss over the sad conditions of life for the city's people: "Their habitations are decayed; their taxes heavy; their pockets light; their opportunities few."

Still, James goes on to sketch enough of the beauty of Venice to make it seem a fair compensation. Throughout the book he constantly comes back to the beauty and amenity of Italian life, despite the all too frequent material shortcomings. Venice and Rome get the most extended treatment, but James doesn't neglect the rest of the country. His Roman essays, though, show the strongest touch of his own experiences, especially his long rides on horseback through the Campagna and his many walks through various neighborhoods in the city.

== Contents ==
1. Venice
2. The Grand Canal
3. Venice: An Early Impression
4. Two Old Houses and Three Young Women
5. Casa Alvisi
6. From Chambéry to Milan
7. The Old Saint-Gothard
8. Italy Revisited
9. A Roman Holiday
10. Roman Rides
11. Roman Neighbourhoods
12. The After-Season in Rome
13. From a Roman Note-Book
14. A Few Other Roman Neighbourhoods
15. A Chain of Cities
16. Siena Early and Late
17. The Autumn in Florence
18. Florentine Notes
19. Tuscan Cities
20. Other Tuscan Cities
21. Ravenna
22. The Saint's Afternoon and Others

== Critical evaluation ==
Few critics have put up much of a struggle against the charm of Italian Hours, the most loving of all James' travel writings. The book is justly valued for its deep appreciation of Italian people, places and art. Although there are inevitable stylistic variations from the earlier essays to the latest, the unevenness hardly spoils the reader's enjoyment and may even add some welcome variety. Writing in The New York Times, critic Adam Begley writes that "the spectacle of Henry James morphing into a lazy, contented, 'uninvestigating' tourist... gives [Italian Hours] a very satisfactory narrative arc."

In The Golden Bowl Maggie relates a pretty image of Amerigo's: "He called it a 'serenade,' a low music that, outside one of the windows of the sleeping house, disturbed his rest at night... when finally, rising on tiptoe, he had looked out, he had recognised in the figure below with a mandolin, all duskily draped in her grace, the raised appealing eyes and the one irresistible voice of the ever-to-be-loved Italy." James could never resist the voice, either.

== Bibliography ==
- Begley, Adam (24 June 2010). "Henry James Walked Here". New York Times (Travel).
- Henry James Collected Travel Writings - The Continent - A Little Tour in France, Italian Hours, Other Travels edited by Richard Howard (New York: Library of America 1993) ISBN 0-940450-77-1
