= Giovanni Cristofano Amaduzzi =

Italian philologist

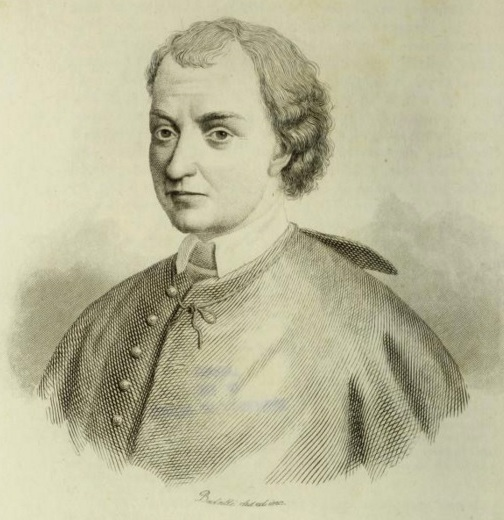
- Giovanni Cristofano Amaduzzi
- Born: June 18, 1740; Savignano sul Rubicone, Papal States
- Died: 21 January 1792 (aged 51); Rome, Papal States
- Occupations: Classical scholar, antiquarian and writer

Academic work
- Discipline: Classics, Oriental studies, classical archaeology
- Institutions: Sapienza University of Rome

Giovanni Cristofano Amaduzzi (18 August 1740 – 21 January 1792) was a distinguished Italian philologist who flourished during the latter half of the eighteenth century.

== Biography ==
Giovanni Cristofano Amaduzzi was born at Savignano, near Rimini, in 1740. He studied in Rimini under the celebrated scholar Giovanni Bianchi. He was superintendent of the press connected with the Propaganda college at Rome, professor of Greek at the University of Rome La Sapienza, and was the means of giving the world several fragments of ancient authors.

He also wrote the preface to Alphabetum grandonico-malabaricum sive samscrudonicum, a book on the grammar of the South Indian Malayalam language, published in 1772.

Amaduzzi died in Rome on 21 January 1792. He was honored with a public funeral and Isidoro Bianchi pronounced his eulogy before the Academy of Mantua. His studies embraced civil and canon law, ecclesiastical history, archaeology, Greek and Oriental literature.

== Main works ==
=== Dissertations ===
- Dissertazione canonico-filologica sopra il titolo delle instituzioni canoniche De officio archidiaconi, s.e., s.i.l. 1767.
- Donaria duo graece loquentia quorum unum in tabula argentea apud moniales Saxoferratenses S. Clarae, s.e., Roma 1774.
- Discorso filosofico sul fine ed utilità dell'Accademie, per i torchi dell'Enciclopedia, Livorno 1777.
- La filosofia alleata della religione. Discorso filosofico-politico, per i torchi dell'Enciclopedia, Livorno 1778.
- Discorso filosofico dell'indole della verità e delle opinioni, dai torchj Pazzini, Siena 1786.

=== Correspondence ===
- Ad virum clarissimum Janum Plancum archiatrum, et patricium Ariminensem epistola, typis J. Rocchii, Lucae 1767.
- De veteri inscriptione Ursi Togati ludi pilae vitreae inventoris epistola, apud B. Francesium, Romae 1775.
- Epistola ad Iohannem Baptistam Bodonium qua emendatur et suppletur commentarium de Anacreontis genere eiusque bibliotheca, in aedibus Palatinis typis Bodonianis, Parmae 1791.
- Il carteggio tra Amaduzzi e Corilla Olimpica 1775-1792, a cura di L. Morelli, Leo S. Olschki, Firenze 2000.
- Lettere familiari, a cura di G. Donati, Accademia dei Filopatridi, Savignano sul Rubicone 2001.
- Carteggio, 1774-1791, a cura di M.F. Turchetti, Edizioni di storia e letteratura, Roma 2005.

=== Books ===
- Leges novellae 5. anecdotae imperatorum Theodosii junioris et Valentiniani, Typ. Zempelianis, Romae 1767.
- Alphabetum Brammhanicum seu Indostanum Universitatis Kasi, (a J. Ch. Amadutio editum), Sac. Cong. de Propaganda Fide, Romae 1771
- Alphabetum Hebraicum addito Samaritano et Rabbinico, Sac. Cong. de Propag. Fide, Romae 1771
- Alphabetum veterum Etruscorum et nonnulla eorundem monumenta, Sac. Cong. de Propaganda Fide, Romae 1771
- Alphabetum Graecum, Sac. Cong. de Propag. Fide, Romae 1771.
- Alphabetum grandonico-malabaricum sive samscrudonicum, Sac. Cong. de Propaganda Fide, Romae 1772
- Alphabetum Tangutanum sive Tibetanum, Sac. Cong. de Propaganda Fide, Romae 1773.
- Anecdota litteraria ex mss. codicibus eruta, voll. 4, apud G. Settarium, Romae 1773.
- Catalogus librorum qui ex typographio sacrae congreg. de propaganda fide variis linguis prodierunt et in eo adhuc asservantur, Sac. Cong. de Propaganda Fide, Romae 1773.
- Alphabetum Barmanum seu Bomanum regni Avae finitimarumque regionum, typis Sacrae Congregationis de Propaganda Fide, Roma 1776.
- Alphabetum Persicum, Sac. Cong. de Propag. Fide, Romae 1783.
- Alphabetum Armenum, Sac. Cong. De Propaganda Fide, Romae 1784.
- Characterum ethicorum Theophrasti Eresii capita duo hactenus anecdota quae ex cod. ms. Vaticano saeculi 11, Typ. Regia, Parmae 1786.
- Alphabetum Aethiopicum sive Gheez et Amhharicum, Sac. Cong. de Propaganda Fide, Romae 1789
