= History of Higher Education of Women in the South, Prior to 1860 =

1909 book by I. M. E. Blandin

History of higher education of women in the South prior to 1860

History of Higher Education of Women in the South, Prior to 1860 was written by I. M. E. Blandin and published in 1909 by Neale Publishing Company. The 327 page book includes data on several hundred schools in the American South. The author places emphasis on the period prior to 1860, but in many instances, the data are brought down to the time of publication.

Most of the descriptions are very minute, some of them practically amounting to a catalogue of the school, academy or institute, as the case may be, enumerating the branches of study taught there, the faculties of successive years, the graduates, and their respective degrees. The curricula described in most cases provide an education far different from higher education as conceived at the time of the book's publication. Some of the cases come rather under the head of elementary education. The book disintegrates rather than integrates the data presented, and gives no definite conclusion concerning the result of this education. As a whole, it is rather a detailed history of the schools themselves, than of the resulting education.

== See also ==
- Southern United States literature
