= Alphabetum grandonico-malabaricum sive samscrudonicum =

Grammar book of Malayalam language

Alphabetum grandonico-malabaricum sive samscrudonicum is a book on the grammar of the South Indian Malayalam language, published in 1772 at the printing press of the Congregatio de Propaganda Fide in Rome. It is believed to be the first book on Malayalam printed in Europe. The Alphabetum grandonico-malabaricum focuses on the pronunciation of the Malayalam alphabet, with many examples in Malayalam characters. It also made use of devanagari fonts. It also includes some remarks on the general characteristics of the grammar. At the end, there are also some short Malayalam sentences of a religious nature, such as the Ten Commandments.

The preface was written by Giovanni Cristofano Amaduzzi, an Italian philologist. The types for the Dravidian script were prepared by Clemente Peani. Amaduzzi supervised the publication of a series of grammars of Oriental languages at the printing press of the Congregatio de Propaganda Fide in Rome. In addition to the Alphabetum grandonico-malabaricum the series comprised, among others, grammars of Burmese, Hindustani, Armenian, Syriac, Arabic, Hebrew, Ethiopian Semitic languages (both Ge'ez and Amharic), Bulgarian etc. Alphabetum grandonico-malabaricum sive samscrudonicum was reprinted several times.

== See also ==
- Samkshepa Vedartham
