= I. M. E. Blandin =

American author, teacher, social worker (1838–1912)

- Born: Isabella Margaret Elizabeth John; 1838; Uniontown, Alabama, U.S.
- Died: June 30, 1912 (aged 73–74); Houston, Texas, U.S.
- Occupations: writer; teacher; social worker
- Spouse: John Wirt Blandin III (m. 1860; died 1866)
- Children: 3
- Writing career
- Pen name: I. M. E. Blandin
- Genre: Southern United States literature
- Notable work: History of Higher Education of Women in the South, Prior to 1860

Isabella Margaret Elizabeth Blandin (née, John; pen name, I. M. E. Blandin; 1838 – June 30, 1912) was an American teacher and social worker. She was also the author of fiction and non-fiction works, History of Higher Education of Women in the South, Prior to 1860 being chief among them.

== Biography ==
Isabella Margaret Elizabeth John was born in Uniontown, Alabama, in 1838. Her parents were Joseph Reid and Rosa Jane (née Smith) John, the former a native of North Carolina, a lawyer who lived in Uniontown and Selma, Alabama.

Her father, with other men of means of Uniontown, subscribed the money to employ teachers to conduct a school in the town, and Blandin received her early education there. She never attended college but gained an equivalent education by private instruction and study.

In Selma, on April 30, 1860, she married John Wirt Blandin III. She was left a widow in 1866 with three children (John, Mary, Belle) and, in order to support them, began, in 1870, to teach school. She taught first in the city schools of Selma, then in Montgomery, Alabama and later in Houston, Texas.

She instituted settlement work in the latter place and organized the first city mission board of which she was president for several years. This board later built and equipped a cooperative home for working girls. Her work among the foreigners resulted in the establishment of free kindergartens, day nurseries, and the employment of several deaconesses to carry on her work. She organized several Sunday schools in Houston, which grew into self-sustaining churches.

History of higher education of women in the South prior to 1860

She was the author of History of Higher Education of Women in the South, Prior to 1860 (The Neale Publishing Company, 1909); History of Shearn Church, 1837-1907 (1908); "A History of Alabama," incomplete at the time of her death; a pamphlet, "From Gonzales to San Jacinto, a Historical Drama of the Texan Revolution" (1897); and a number of short stories published in various periodicals.

Isabella Margaret Elizabeth Blandin died June 30, 1912, at Houston, Texas.

== Selected works ==
=== Pamphlets ===
- "From Gonzales to San Jacinto, a Historical Drama of the Texan Revolution" (1897) (text)

=== Books ===
- History of Higher Education of Women in the South, Prior to 1860 (The Neale Publishing Company, 1909) (text)
- History of Shearn Church, 1837-1907 (1908) (text)
