= Captain Tatham of Tatham Island =

1909 novel by Edgar Wallace

- Author: Edgar Wallace
- Language: English
- Genre: Adventure
- Publisher: Gale and Polden
- Publication date: 1909
- Publication place: United Kingdom
- Media type: Print

Captain Tatham of Tatham Island, sometimes shortened to Captain Tatham, is a 1909 adventure novel by the British writer Edgar Wallace. It is not told in a straight linear narrative, as with most Wallace novels, but instead consists of a series of witness statements by various characters involved. In rereleases its title was changed first to The Island of Galloping Gold and then Eve's Island.

An American adventurer sets out to found a new state on an uninhabited Pacific island. He supports his endeavour by running a thoroughbred racehorse in a series of English races and winning a fortune.

== Bibliography ==
- Clark, Neil. Stranger than Fiction: The Life of Edgar Wallace, the Man Who Created King Kong. Stroud, UK: The History Press, 2015.
