= Sándor Kisfaludy =

Hungarian lyric poet

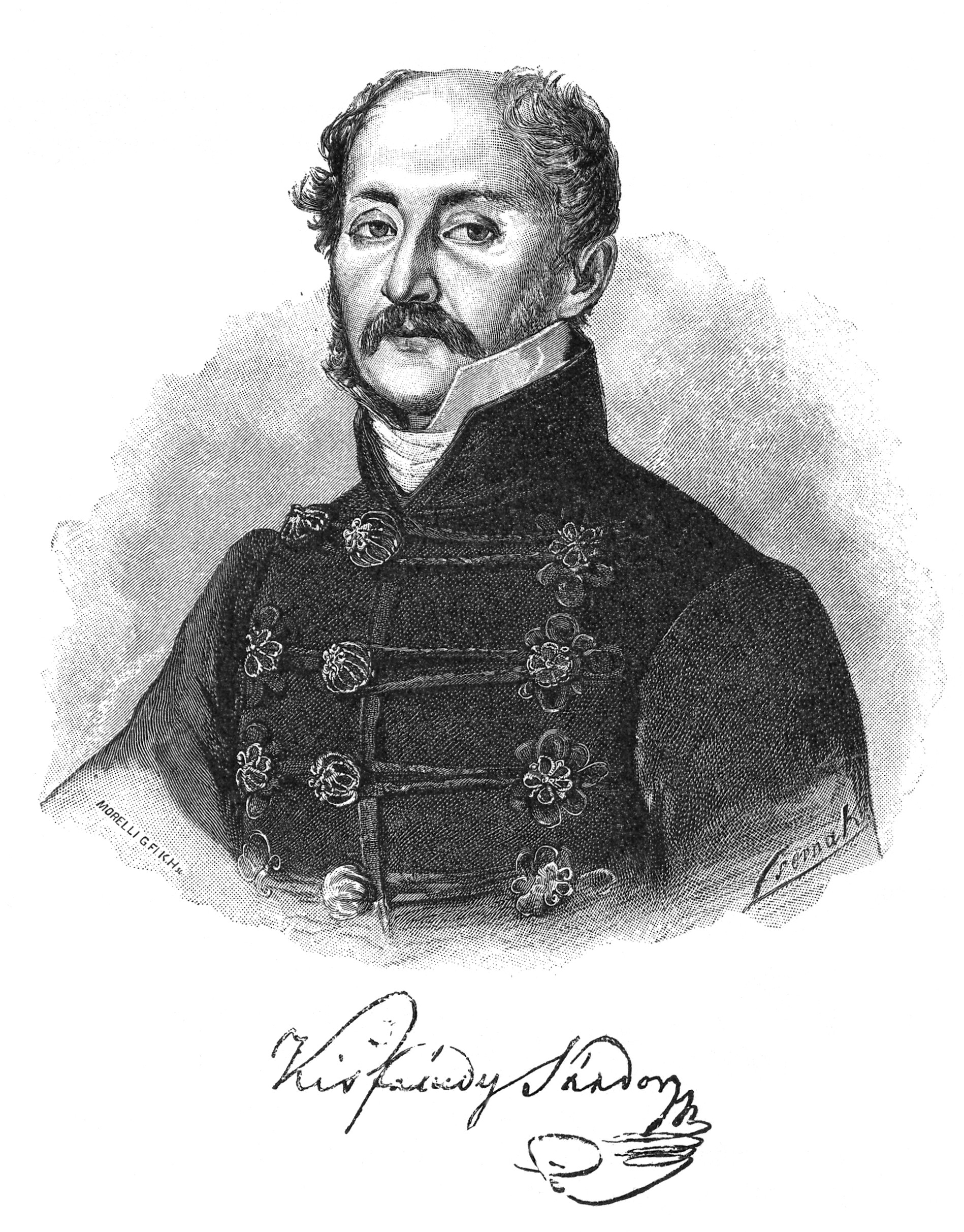
Sándor Kisfaludy

Sándor Kisfaludy (27 September 1772 – 28 October 1844) was a Hungarian lyric poet, Himfy's Loves his chief work, was less distinguished as a dramatist. He is considered to be the first romantic poet from Hungary. He was the brother of Károly Kisfaludy. He has been set to music by Zoltán Kodály.

== Biography ==
He was born in a Hungarian noble family in the town of Sümeg, in Zala county. His father was Mihály Kisfaludy (1743–1825), landowner and chief magistrate (főszolgabíró), and his mother was the noble lady Anna Sándorffy (1755–1788). He first started building a career as a military officer. He served in Vienna as an officer in the imperial army, and then took part in the war against Napoleon, defending Milan. In June 1796, during the siege of the Sforza Castle in Milan, he was taken prisoner of war and taken to France, where he was transported to Draguignan. He wrote about the days he spent here and his acquaintance with Julie-Caroline d'Esclapon in his diary: "My French Captivity". It was thanks to the educated girl that he began to sing under the influence of Francesco Petrarca and the French lyric. He was released by a prisoner exchange and then returned to service, but after completing his military service in Württemberg, he was demobilized from the army.

His passionate love life is inseparable from his literary work. Upon returning home, he burst into Hungarian literature and public consciousness with his poems entitled Himfy's Loves, which he wrote under a pseudonym. At the age of 32-35, he was already the celebrated poet of the Kingdom of Hungary. He is the founder of Hungarian literary romanticism, and he made a lasting impression mainly with his love lyrics. The song structure he created is called the Himfy stanza in the verstan. According to István Toldy, with the song cycle Himfy's Loves, which is considered his masterpiece, he "introduced a significant turn in Hungarian literary taste" and "gained civil rights for love poetry, which until then had been subject to the censorship of ecclesiastical and secular forums".

His first wife was Róza Szegedy de Mezőszeged (Kám, Vas county, 6th April 1774 – Sümeg, Zala county, 18th May 1832), who he considered was his most important muse of inspiration. She was the daughter of the noble man Ignác Szegedy de Mezőszeged (1736-1796), royal counselor, vice-ispán of the Vas county (alispán of Vas), landowner and the noble lady Katalin Rosty de Barkócz (1753-1787), who hailed from the ancient House of Rosty de Barkócz.
