= György Bessenyei =

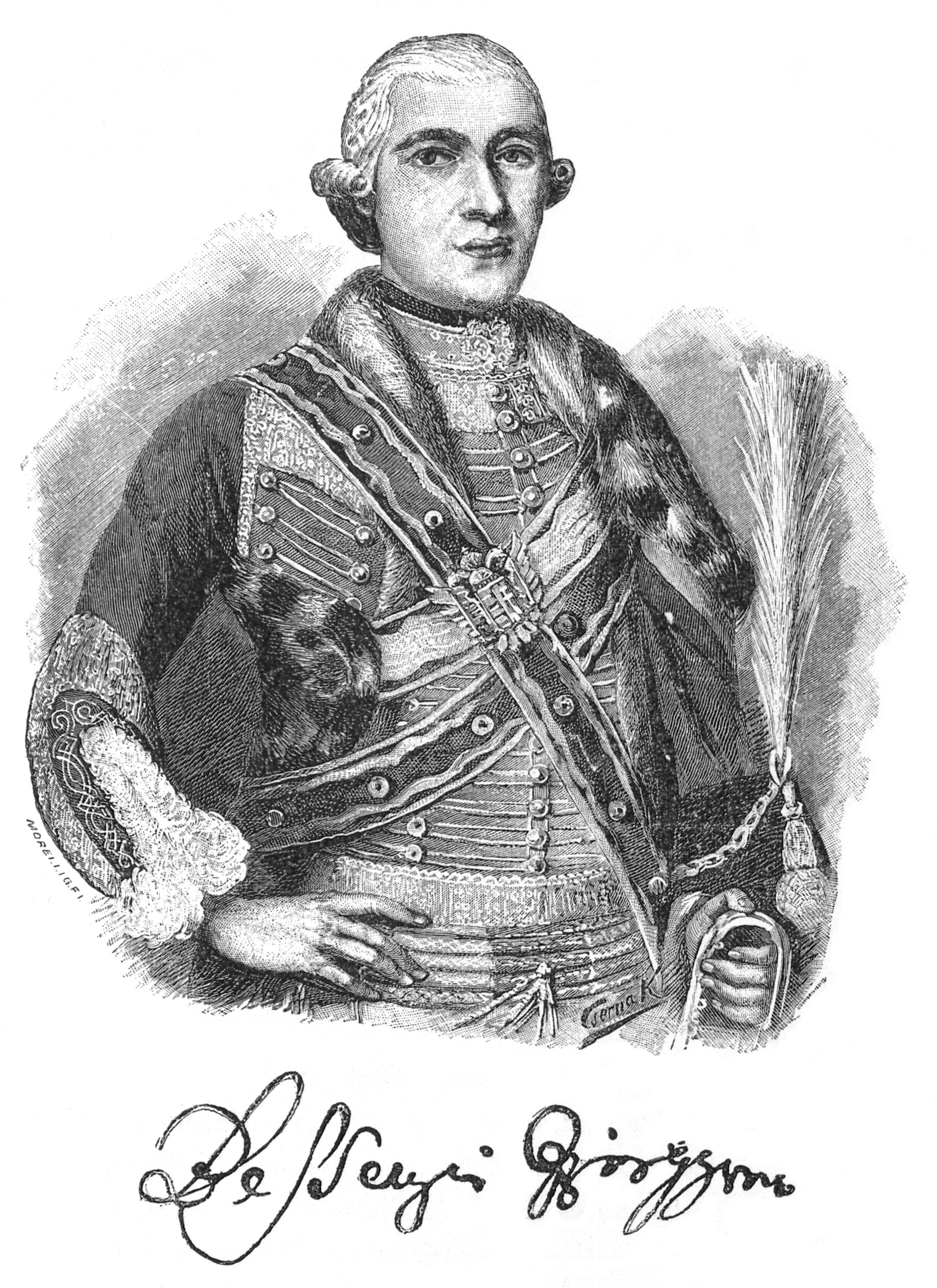

György Bessenyei (1747–1811) was a Hungarian playwright and poet who lived in the Austrian Empire.

== Works ==
- 1772 – Ágis tragédiája
- 1777 – A magyar néző
- 1777 – A filozófus
- 1778 – Magyarság
- 1779 – A holmi
- 1781 – Egy magyar társaság iránt való jámbor szándék
- 1799 – A természet világa
- 1804 – Tarimenes utazása
