= Mollie Evelyn Moore Davis =

American poet

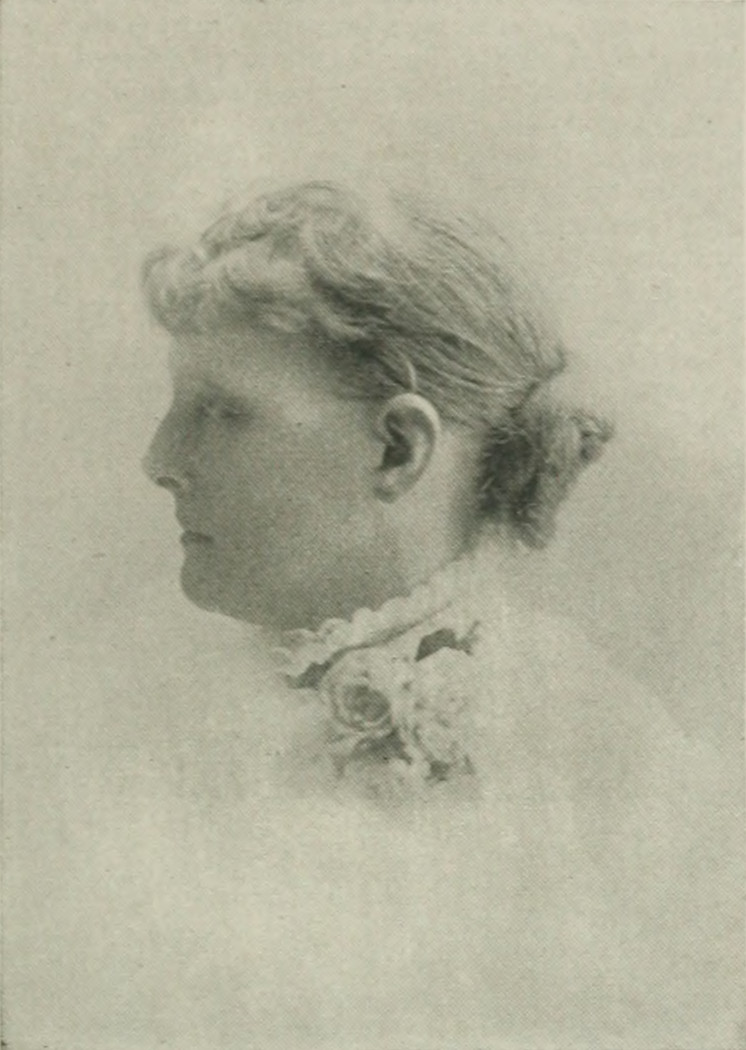
- Portrait from "A Woman of the Century"
- Born: Mary Evalina Moore; April 12, 1844; Talladega, Alabama, U.S.
- Died: January 1, 1909 (aged 64); New Orleans, Louisiana, U.S.
- Occupations: poet; writer; editor
- Spouse: Thomas Edward Davis (m. 1874)
- Writing career
- Pen name: M. E. M. Davis
- Language: English
- Genre: Southern United States literature

Mollie Evelyn Moore Davis (née, Moore; pen name, M. E. M. Davis; April 12, 1844 – January 1, 1909) was an American poet, writer, and editor of the long nineteenth century. From the age of 14, she wrote regularly for the press and other periodicals. Though born in Alabama, a critic said of her that she was "more thoroughly Texan in subject, in imagery and spirit than any of the Texas poets," and that scarcely any other than a native Texan could "appreciate all the merits of her poems, so strongly marked are they by the peculiarities of Texas scenery and patriotism."

== Early life and education ==
Mary Evalina Moore was born in Talladega, Alabama, on April 12, 1844. (Note: April 12, 1852 is also mentioned.) She was the only daughter of Dr. John Moore and Lucy Crutchfield. Her father was born at Oxford, Massachusetts. He moved to Alabama after receiving classical training and graduating in medicine. Her mother's family lived in Chattanooga, Tennessee. Two of her maternal uncles, Thomas and William, attained the rank of colonel, the former in the Confederate, the latter in the Union army. Her father was a pioneer in the manufacture of iron in Alabama, discovering the ore in 1848, smelting it with charcoal, and forging it into bars under a trip hammer operated by water power. A few years before the outbreak of the American Civil War, Dr. Moore moved to Texas with his family to run a cotton plantation, La Rose Blanche Plantation, in Hays County on the banks of the San Marcos River

At La Rose Blanche, Moore was taught by private tutors, and began to write verses. With her brother, she learned not only to read, but to ride, shoot and swim.

== Career ==
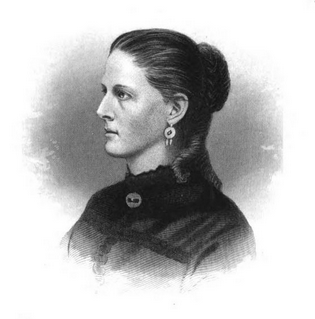
Molly E. Moore

In 1874, Moore married Major Thomas Edward Davis, for many years the editor of The Daily Picayune. They moved to New Orleans and took up residence in the center of the old French Quarter. She was admitted into the innermost circle of the most exclusive Creole society, where she developed a knowledge of historical circumstances, traditions and customs.

=== Poetry ===
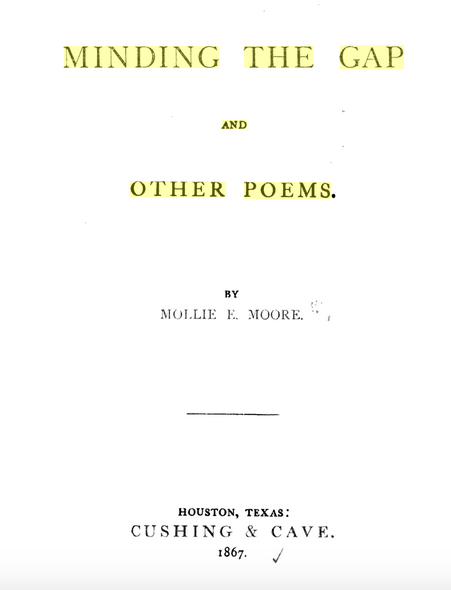
Minding the Gap

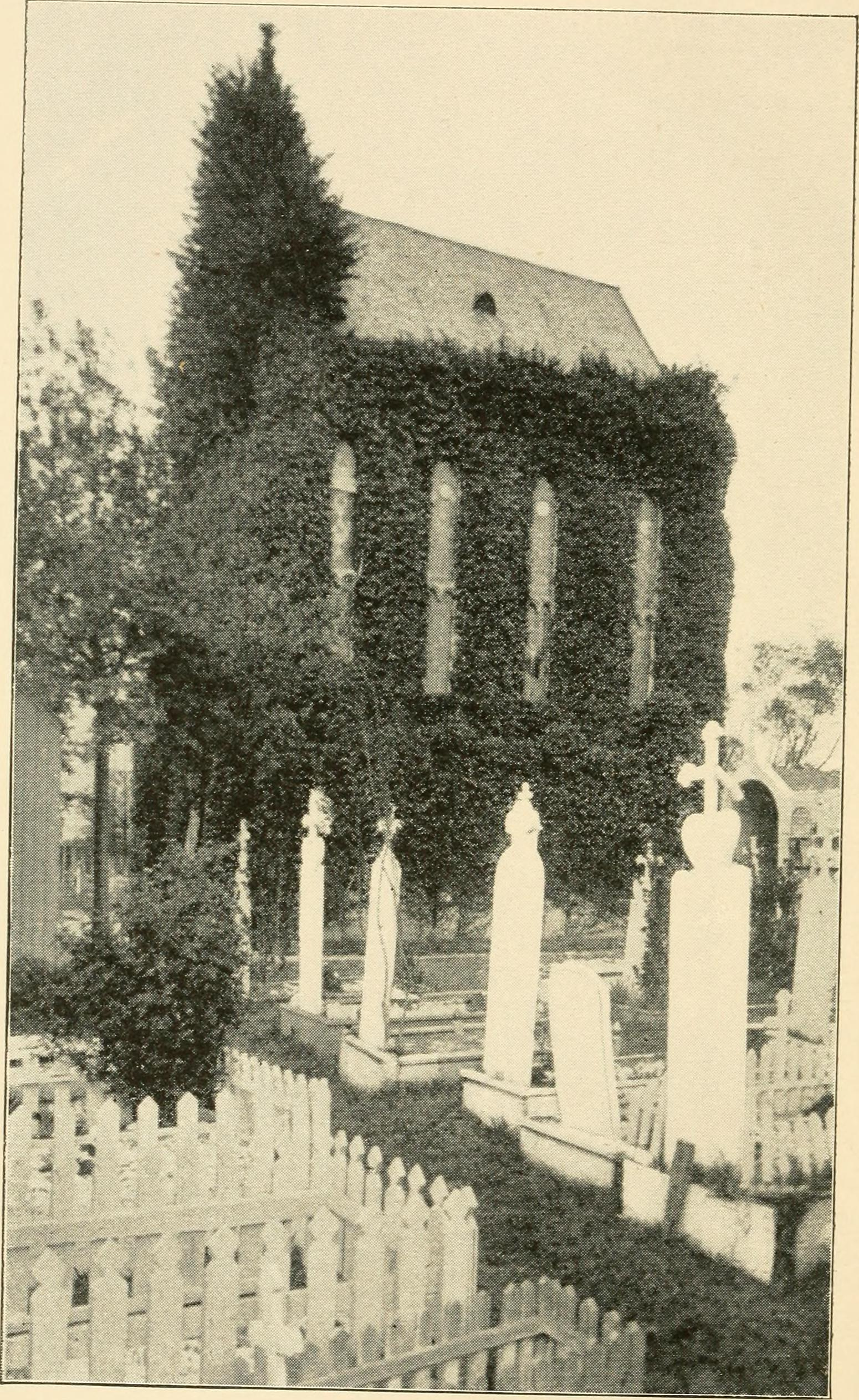
A Christmas masque of "Saint Roch", "Père Dagobert", and "Throwing the wanga" (1896)

Davis' first volume of poems, entitled Minding the Gap, and Other Poems (Houston, Texas) was published in 1867, and passed through further editions after being enlarged and corrected. Her poems "Going Out and Coming In", "San Marcos River", "Stealing Roses Through the Gate", and "Lee at the Wilderness" were subsequently included in collections of American verse. The mystic prose poem, "The Song of the Opal", the classical "Pere Dagobert", "Throwing the Wanga", "The Center Rigger", and "The Elephant's Track" were written for Harper's Magazine, while many poems and sketches were published in other periodicals.

=== Short stories ===
Davis also wrote short stories, many for the northern monthlies, and some were collected and republished in An Elephant's Track and Other Stories. The lighter and more humorous aspects of life were her favorites. Her short stories, such as "The Song of the Opal", "The Soul of Rose Dede" and "A Miracle", were well received, and a volume of sketches entitled In War Times at La Rose Blanche (Boston, 1888), were translated into French as La Revue des Deux Mondes. "Keren Happuch and I" was a series of sketches contributed to the New Orleans Picayune. "Snaky baked a Hoe-Cake", "Grief", and others contributed to Wide Awake in 1876, were among the first African American Vernacular English stories which appeared in print.

=== Novels ===
The series of works in which Davis portrayed the life of Texas and Louisiana included: In War Times at La Rose Blanche Plantation (Lothrop and Company, Boston); Under the Man-Fig (Houghton, Mifflin and Company, Boston); An Elephant's Track, and Other Stories (Harper and Brothers, New York, 1897); The Story of Texas Under Six Flags (Ginn and Company, Boston, 1898); The Wire Cutters (Houghton, Mifflin and Company, 1899); The Queen's Garden (Houghton, Mifflin and Company, Boston, 1900); Jaconetta (Houghton, Mifflin and Company, Boston, 1901); The Little Chevalier (Houghton, Mifflin and Company, Boston, 1905); The Price of Silence (Houghton, Mifflin and Company, Boston, 1907); The Bunch of Roses (Small and Maynard, Boston). Of these In War Times at La Rose Blanche Plantation and Jaconetta were largely autobiographical, both dealing with the early years of her life. "Jaconetta" was Davis's childhood nickname at La Rose Blanche during the American Civil War.

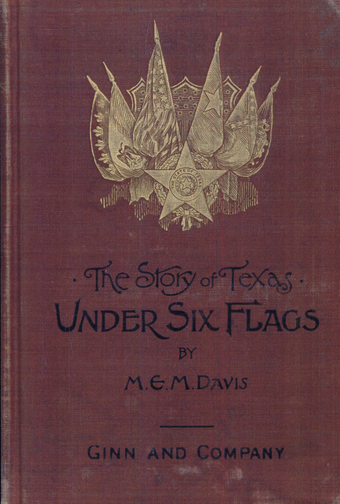
The Story of Texas under Six Flags

Under Six Flags is a child's history of the "Lone Star State," which features a dramatized retelling of a romanticised version of Texas history, used to arouse state pride in Texan youth.

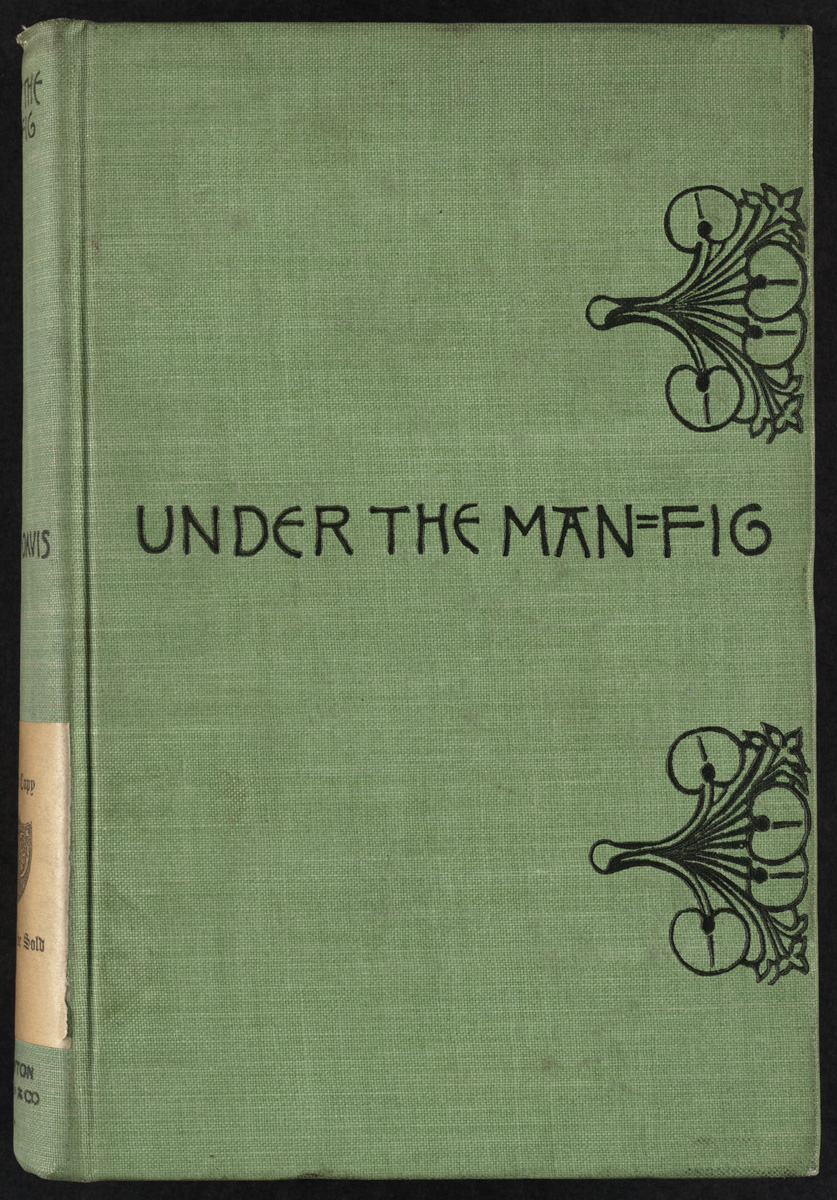
Under the man-fig

The life in Texas furnishes the background for two other books in this list: Under the Man-Fig and The Wire Cutters, both to be numbered with her more important works, and both developing ingenious and rather complicated plots through which love stories are guided to the end. Davis' novel Under the Man-Fig, was described by a reviewer as "a tale at once strongly dramatic, clean and artistic," while her work generally is described by the same writer as being "characterized by a keen sense of humor, a fine restrained pathos and a delicate play of fancy". In the Queen's Garden is an idyl whose scene is laid in New Orleans. It is in The Little Chevalier, by many regarded as her masterpiece, and The Price of Silence that Davis made the most minute and painstaking study of Creole life, manners, and character.

== Literary style and themes ==
In all of her stories, she specialises in pictorial affect. The great elemental feelings in general suffice for her purposes. Her works are noted for producing a vivid picture in the mind of the reader. To do this, she uses her own personal resources and observations, as well as employing animated description.

Her work is noted for its narrative quality and its use of Afro-American folklore and superstition, which she incorporated both as elements of local color and as devices within the development of her plots. She also depicted aspects of Afro-American life and character, and occasionally employed Afro-American dialect in her writing, generally using it sparingly.

== Personal life ==
In 1874, she married Major Thomas Edward Davis, of Virginia, for many years associated with the Houston Telegram, who later served as editor-in-chief of the Picayune. In 1880, the couple made their home in New Orleans, and every year their historic house in Royal Street received people in town, both French and American residents. With all her social cares, she found time for reading and study and hospitality. She was an accomplished French scholar as well as a lover and student of Spanish literature. She was president of the "Geographies", a literary circle, and vice-president of the "Quarante", a large and fashionable literary club. In both those organizations, she was recognized as a mental guide, philosopher and friend.

Moore died at her home in New Orleans on January 1, 1909.
