= Tharakan =

Tharakan may refer to:

== Title ==
- Tharakan (title), an honorific hereditary title given for aristocratic knanaya Christians and few Saint Thomas Christian families in Kerala, India
- Tharakan (Hindu caste), a Hindu caste from the Palakkad district of Kerala, India

== Persons ==
- Thachil Matthoo Tharakan (1741–1814), influential Syrian Christian leader, minister, trader and exporter who played a major role in the history of erstwhile Travancore and Cochin kingdoms of modern-day Kerala, India
- Puthencavu Mathan Tharakan (1903–1993), Malayalam poet who earned the title Mahakavi
- K. M. Tharakan (1930–2003), critic, novelist, litterateur and educationalist from Kerala, India
- Hormis Tharakan, Indian Police Service officer from Kerala who was the chief of the Research and Analysis Wing (R&AW) of India during 2005–2007

== See also ==
- Ezhupunna Tharakan, a 1989 Malayalam movie
