= Guptan =

Hindu forward community in Kerala, South India

Guptan is a Hindu forward community from the Palakkad district of Kerala, South India. The majority of the Guptans are located in Valluvanad, with major agglomerations around Vayillyamkunnu, Kadampazhippuram, Sreekrishnapuram, Chethallur and Mannarkkad. Many Sanskrit scholars and popular astrologers originated from this community.

== Etymology ==
The name Guptan is derived from the Sanskrit word Gupt "protected, secret". It also denotes the position in society.

== Gothram ==
Guptans belong to Kailasa Gothram. Agriculture and business were their traditional ways of earning a living in times past. They follow Makkathaayam traditions and the after death pollution time(pula)-the defilement period- for family members is 10 days.

Male members are identified by their family (Tharavad) name and female members move in with their husband's family after marriage and keep the husband's family name. The title "Guptan" is referred to commonly after the middle age. Married female members were earlier addressed as "Akathaal" (in short as "Thaal")− means the person who spends their life inside the house- and with time, the suffix transformed to "Ammal" and later to Amma and Gupta.

== Origin ==
=== Legend ===
There are some details available about the origin of this community – in 'KOTTICHEZHUNNALLATH' (The first programme used to be conducted by Samoothiri (Zamorin) kings after swearing on ceremony of each Eralppad- second in command − to establish their control over the region. The last KOTTICHEZHUNNALLATH was believed to be held in 1909 ). It points to the era way back to 13th–14th century which says about the asylum of a minister and his men from a local kingdom in the bank of river Kaveri of then Cholamandalam – to the king of Calicut (Kozhikkode) – The dispute arose from the decision of local king to marry the clever daughter of the minister who had found out a solution for a challenging problem which was haunting the king for days together. The legend – The challenge was to make a necklace within 41 days, using a bowl of peculiar pearls which was gifted by some foreign traders to the king. As the holes were curved inside, many famous brilliant pandits had tried and failed to make a pearl necklace. However, the intelligent teenage daughter of the minister succeeded in finding a solution for the challenge and made the necklace with the help of some ants by using a thread soaked in ghee. Impressed upon the extraordinary intelligence of the girl who made the pearl necklace, the ruling king wanted to marry her. But as the king was inferior in caste, the minister and his related families disagreed. The angry king gave an ultimatum for accepting the marriage or all were asked to leave the kingdom. Due to this the entire population in the desam, consisting of around 7200 families from many sections had to travel away from chola-desam and were segregated in groups. Some of the groups traveled towards west to Cheranaadu (presently Keralam).

As they had a bitter experience of living in a kingdom where they could not get justice from their king, they decided to settle in a Desam(place) where the ruling king has vision and justice. To find that, they used to present a pot filled with gold but covered it with a layer of sugar on top. They usually had the habit of sitting before the king (which was meant disrespectful in other kingdoms), and after giving the pot, they requested the king to give them land for living. Normally the kings to whom they approached rejected their request as the kings thought it was foolish to give them land in lieu of sugar. Finally, they reached Walluvanad area and approached Samoothiri (Zamorin) of Kozhikkode (Calicut)for land. They had the same test with Zamorin. But King Zamorin got offended because of their practice of sitting in front of the king and asked his minister "Mangattachan" to check the pot. After finding the golden powder inside the pot, Zamorin appraised their cleverness but to check their integrity, he asked them to come again the next day. To test them, Zamorin made the place where they sit dirty by covering it in mud but they again sat there by spreading a cloth on the muddy floor. After seeing this, the king understood it was not that they did not want to respect the king but it was their habit. Impressed by their intelligence and straightforwardness, Samoothiri gave permission to build 'nagarams' (at places they liked) and sent pathinaayirathil nair – The chieftain who can arrange that much warriors on demand by zamorin – along with them and asked them to meet the king after construction of their Kuladevatha temples.

They built four 'nagarams' called Puthanangadi, Thiruvazhiyode, Vayillyamkunnu and Mangode (current names Chethallur, Thiruvazhiyode / sreekrishnapuram, Katampazhippuram and Mangode respectively) for cultivation and trade. After construction of temples, they met samoothiri along with their acharya. Impressed by the acharya's sivapooja and devotion, Samoothiri gave more land and arranged adiyantharakkar for them (the temple constructed for those adiyanthirakkar – "kammalasserykkaavu" is still there near Thiruvazhiyode) but as per the local tradition, samoothiri restricted the wearing of poonool (the sacred thread) to upanayanam & marriage time only and later the tradition has been discontinued.

=== Historical background ===
It is believed that the groups mainly consisting of Guptans along with members of Tharakan community reached valluvanad were of Eralpuram , Adithyapuram, Paschimapuram & Ramapuram nagarams under the leadership of the minister SANKARA NAYANAR ( belonging to Eralpuram nagaram) and they took their kuladevatha (Goddess) Bhagavathy and acharya Gyanasivacharya along with them. The senior most member of the "Sankarath" family in Thiruvazhiyode (near Ottappalam in Palakkad District of Kerala) is still holding the title Nayanar and they are one of the "Temple ooralans" (ക്ഷേത്ര ഊരാളന്‍) of the "Thiruvaraykkal" Bhagavathy Temple. Thiruvazhiyode nagaram was considered the "Melnagaram" among the four nagarams and the tradition of giving "Nagarappanam" to Thiruvazhiyode group during marriage (if any one of bride-groom is from Thiruvazhiyode) was followed in earlier days. This ritual was to mark respect for the "Aadi Nayanar".

The name Guptan was assigned to this group belonging to valluvanad region, by Zamorin(being vaishya and part of "Thraivarnnikam" ) through Punnasseri Nambi Neelakanta Sharma (earlier addressed as Moothan (Moothavan meaning elder) and sometimes as Ezhssan(Ezhuthachan), Menon (Melavan – a position in village), Andaar (Andavan), etc.). The title was initially started at Punnassery Namby Gurukulam (Saraswathodyodini), Pattambi where prominent Sanskrit scholar and astrologer CK Krishna Guptan was the beloved disciple of Sri Nambi. Later Guptans became part of the history of Valluvanadan area.

== Religion and hereditary ==
As Guptans are of Kailasa Gothram, it is considered that they belong to "Saivite" group. And Durga(Parasakthi)of "Ardhanareeswara" concept of Lord Siva was predominant and reflected in their traditions and customs. "Saktheya" upasana was very common in Guptan families in olden days. It was a tradition to conduct Saktheya pooja (Bhuvaneswari pooja) once in a year in each family earlier, for overall prosperity and still some families are following this tradition. Suryanarayanan Ezhuthachan and his nephew Devaguru – Thunchan's beloved disciples – were performing Saktheya pooja and their successors of Chozhiyath family of Mangalamkunnu (near Ottappalam) perform Saktheya poojas even now.The usage of Thunchath, Chozhiyath, Chokkath by locals were popular in this area till the second half of the 20th century.

In the family goddess (paradevatha) concept, each Guptan family is attached to one of the three Bhagavathi Temples, viz. Panamkurussi(Chethallur), Vayillyamkunnu(Kadampazhippuram) and Thiruruvaraykkal (Thiruvazhiyode) situated in erstwhile valluvanad area of the Palakkad District. Vayillyamkunnu Bhagavathy temple is considered as one of the three Thirumandhamkunnu Temples along with Angadippuram & Kongad. A story related to Samoothiri(Zamorin) about the power of Panamkurussy Bhagavathy on his way to Karimpuzha is still popular in Chethallur area. The other Nagara temple of "Mangode" is attached to related community "Tharakan". Moothans of Palakkad town & Mannadiyars of Nenmara & Kollengode are other similar community groups related to them. Though there are slight differences in traditions and customs and the legend behind the origin of Guptans from these groups, marriages are taking place between them nowadays.

Some tharavad have places for sarpantine god (സർപ്പക്കാവ്‌/നാഗത്തറ)‌ with Idols carved out of stone, with shape of snake-head placed on an elevated platform. Members of such tharavad perform prayers in respect to the Naga demi gods (veluthanmaar). As a ritual, deepam (oil lamp) is lighted there during dusk. Nagaradhana is common in most of the Kerala houses. A pooja is conducted for the nagas once in a year and all family members take part in that.

== Lifestyle and occupation ==
Guptans were traditionally farmers and agriculture was their main way of earning livelihoods in olden days. Families without even a small paddy field was very rare in those times. The cross section of the community was a blend, ranging from poor farmers to big feudal land lords. Most of their houses were called "Kalam" (കളം) which means the place for after – harvesting activities of paddy. After the land reforms, the attraction of agriculture was in the downward trend and some have shifted to plantation field and later focused on education, business and service sectors. Teaching was the most popular profession in earlier days among the community and many prominent Teachers with their proud disciples had positively contributed towards the improvement of their community as well as the society in general. Today's generations are more focused on professional education and many have excelled in the fields of Engineering, Medical Science, Robotics, Space Technology, Computer Software, etc. But there is almost a vacuum in the area of political and civil administration.

Food habits of Guptans are a mix of vegetarian and non-vegetarian. Though many women still prefer to be vegetarian but majority of men eat non- vegetarian food (mainly fish & chicken). Other than the normal Hindu festivals like Onam, Vishu& Thiruvathira, another special festival related to Onam, 'POTTA THIRUVONAM' (on the day of Thiruvonam star coming in the Malayalam month of 'thulam') used to be celebrated in olden days mainly for showing the sister's affection to their brothers – similar to the concept of Rakhi of North India. One major occasion of family get together of these groups are during the annual temple 'pooram'(പൂരം) festival of their respective paradevatha temples.

== Marriage customs and traditions ==
Guptans' marriage related processes start from "Ashtamangalyam" (അഷ്ടമംഗല്യം) function – the engagement at bride's residence. After horoscope matching, on the day of "Ashtamangalyam", a "Thamboola Prasnam" – astrological prediction based on Beettle leaves and Deepam (oil lamp) – will be conducted as a ritual and results of the "Prasna" will be interpreted to all relatives assembled there. (This is to take remedial measures and precautions for hurdles foreseen in the future married life, if any.). Other customs connected to this function are tying of horoscopes of bride & groom together symbolically for the fixation of marriage and "Pon veykkal" ( presenting Gold ornament to bride) by Groom's relatives (normally sister of groom) followed by feast. Dowry system is not in this community and rather a tradition of giving ONAPPUDAVA (ഓണപ്പുടവ) – giving clothes – by groom to the relatives (of both bride & groom) is still followed during marriage as part of taking blessings from elders.

Marriage is normally called "PAANIGRAHANAM" ( പാണീഗ്രഹണം ) and it is a simple function nowadays (earlier marriage was eventful for four days and groom used to travel to bride's house on an elephant). Today's marriages are for one day and some major customs still followed are "AYIRU UNNAL(AYINIOONU) – having a feast (for groom and his aid, normally brother-in-law) before starting from the house, KUDA PIDIYKKAL – groom's aid will hold umbrella till they reach bride's house irrespective of the weather and "Nadhaswaram" – treated as sacred music will be accompanied, THALAPPOLI – receiving function at bride's residence(marriage hall)by girls with a tray of flowers and oil lamp, KAALU KAZHUKAL – Bride's younger brother will clean the groom's feet while receiving him to the mandapam, MANGALYAM (solemn Vow) – Tying the Mangalyam (Mangal suthra)- thali chain in the bride's neck and exchange of rings there after, PAANIGRAHANAM (accepting the bride by taking holy vows) – Bride's uncle ( or father) will perform the "kanya daanam" by keeping the hand of bride into the hand of groom and AGNI PRADHAKSHINAM – after holding the hands mutually by a knot of their small fingers, groom and bride together move around the "Vivaha-homa agni"-the sacred fire.

Kaikottikkali, an important art form by women folk used to be performed in bride's house (previous night of starting of the marriage) and groom's residence (on the final day of marriage after receiving bride & groom) in olden days. Elite class used to conduct Kathakali too. 'Palum Pazhavum' (feeding sweet milk and banana after marriage) and 'Kavukeral'( visiting their respective paradevatha temples after 7 days of marriage) are other customs related to marriage.

=== Birth-related rituals ===
On birth of a child in the family, the main rituals are 'Irupathettu' – the first birth day (star) as per lunar calendar (28th day after birth) and 'Choroon' (ചോറൂണ്) – first feeding of food (annaprasam) in 6th month along with child's naming ceremony(നാമകരണം). Shashtipoorthy (ഷഷ്ഠിപൂര്‍ത്തി) – 60th birthday & Sathabhishekam(ശതാഭിഷേകം) – seeing of 1000 full moon/84th birth day, 90th birthday(നവതി)

are celebrated widely.

=== Death rituals ===
Guptans observe ten days of defilement (pula- after death pollution time). After cremation, the eldest son will follow deeksha for these days (or for a mandalam – 41 days or a year). On Tenth day is 'Sanchayanam' – collection of bones after the cremation of the demised person – and 'Nimanjanam' of the collected bones at a nearby river followed by 'Baliitharppanam' by 'seshakriyakkar'. Some part of the collected bones are taken to Thirunelli, Thirunavaya, Thiruvilwamala or to a nearby similar place for ‘Nimanjanam’ on eleventh day or after a year.

== Cultural and social heritage ==
Vayillyamkunnu was one of the major cultural centers in South Malabar during pre-independence era due to the excellence of many Sanskrit scholars in the area. It is believed that great Thunchan & Sree Punnassery Nambi had blessed this place because of the presence their beloved disciples. The community has produced a number of Sanskrit scholars in the past. "Balasubhodini" of vayillyamkunnu under Churamath Kannankulangara Krishnan Guptan (also known as Kutty Ezhuthachan ) was the nodal center for Sanskrit education in that region (later grown as Oriental college of Sanskrit under Madras university) and closed down in 1947 due to shortage of students.

Though Guptans were mingled well with other communities in their society but not organized well as a community, earlier as well as today. Some initiative took place in the direction of caste cohesion during the 1980s when 'Arya Vaisya Samajam' was launched and later it became 'Guptan Sevana Samajam' and it works for the welfare of the members by promoting academic excellence etc. 'Aryayogam Matrimonial Services' is another initiative in the social front today.
