= Perumkunnil Junction =

- village
- Location in Kerala, India Perumkunnil Junction (India)
- Coordinates: 9°17′38″N 76°41′39″E
- Country: India
- State: Kerala
- District: Pathanamthitta

Languages
  - Official: Malayalam, English
- Time zone: UTC+5:30 (IST)
- PIN: 689507
- Telephone code: 91-468
- Vehicle registration: KL-03
- Nearest city: Aranmula

Perumkunnil Junction (also known as VazhanasalaMukk) is a small village in Pathanamthitta district, Travancore region, Kerala, India. It is on the route between Aranmula (famous for its boat races) and Pathanamthitta (en route to the holy pilgrimage destination of Sabarimala). The majority of its inhabitants are from Hindu and Christian backgrounds. It is well connected to various places such as Chengannur (9 km), Pandalam (8 km), Aranmula (5 km), Kozhencherry (8.5 km), Pathanamthitta (14 km) by different roads.

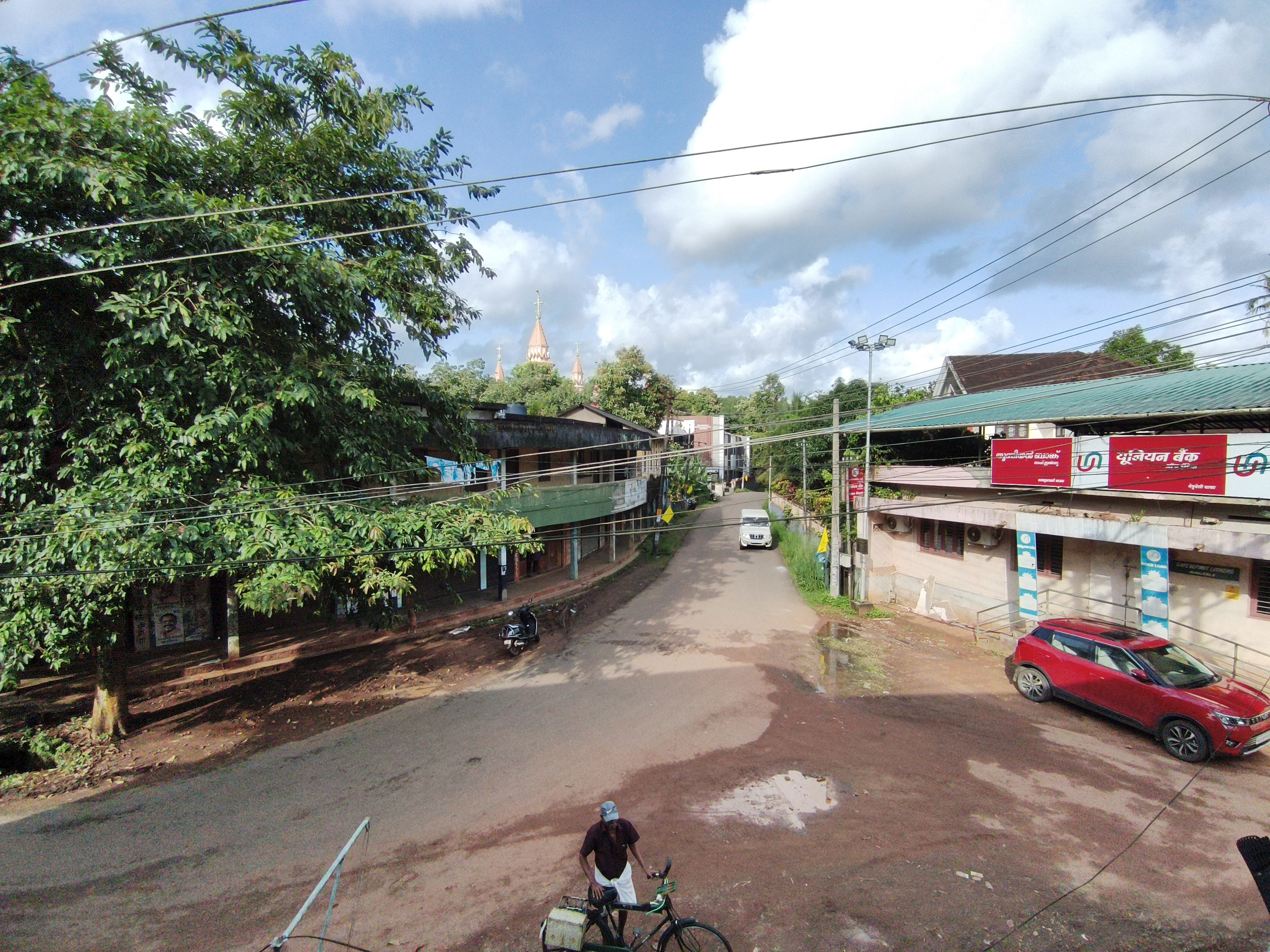
Perumkunnil Junction

== Nearby towns ==
- Pandalam,
- Kulanada,
- Pathanamthitta,
- Kozhencherry,
- Aranmula,
- Kidangannur,
- Elavumthitta,
- Chengannur,
- Thiruvalla,
- Mezhuveli

== Places of importance ==
- Mezhuveli Vazhanasala
- Corporation Bank
- G.I.S UP School
- Holy Innocent Orthodox church, Mezhuveli
- India Pentecostal Church of God
- Assemblies of God in India
- St. George Jacobite Church (Malankavu Palli)
- Syrian Malankara Catholic Church (Reeth Palli)
- Kidangannoor Market
- Aringottu Kavu
- Pallimukkathamma Devi Temple
