= Tharakan (Hindu caste) =

Hindu caste from Palakkad, Kerala, India

Tharakan is a Hindu community from the Palakkad district of Kerala, South India. The majority of the Tharakans are located in Valluvanad, with major agglomerations around Vellinezhi, Vayillyamkunnu, Adoor,Kadambazhippuram, Kuttanassery, Sreekrishnapuram, Mangode, Thiruvazhiyode, Chethallur, and Mannarkkad. reasons and settled.

== Etymology ==
The word Tharakan literally means the holder of document of Raja (Tharakan: Common letter or document of Raja, Gundert's dictionary). They are so called because they were the recipients of 'Tharaku' or writ of social privilege issued to them by the ruling head of the Zamorins of Calicut.

Tharakans are a Hindu group.

== Origin ==
=== Legend ===
They built four 'nagarams' called Puthanangadi, Thiruvazhiyode, Vayillyamkunnu and Mangode (current names Chethallur, Thiruvazhiyode / sreekrishnapuram, Katampazhippuram and Mangode respectively) for cultivation and trade. After construction of temples, they met samoothiri along with their acharya. Impressed by the acharya's sivapooja and devotion, Samoothiri gave more land and arranged adiyantharakkar for them (the temple constructed for those adiyanthirakkar - "kammalasserykkaavu" is still there near Thiruvazhiyode)

=== Historical background ===
It is believed that the groups consisting of Tharakan along with members of Guptans community reached valluvanad were of Eralpuram, Adithyapuram, Paschimapuram & Ramapuram nagarams under the leadership of the minister SANKARA NAYANAR ( belonging to Eralpuram nagaram) and they took their kuladevatha (Goddess) Bhagavathy and acharya Gyanasivacharya along with them.. Thiruvazhiyode nagaram was considered the "Melnagaram" among the four nagarams and the tradition of giving "Nagarappanam" to Thiruvazhiyode group during marriage (if any one of bride-groom is from Thiruvazhiyode) was followed in earlier days. This ritual was to mark respect for the "Aadi Nayanar".

== See also ==
- Guptan

== Resources ==
- Aaryavaisyanmaar (1987)
- EP Bhaskara Guptan, Desayanam, Samabhavini Books (2004)
- Prof. KP Narayana Pisharody, Punnassery Neelakanta Sharma
- Puliyath Krishnan. Kutty Guptan
- Kesari Magazine – Nila edition (1971)
- Adiyath Ramaguptan, Vayillyamkunnu Devaswom Sthalapuranam.
