= Geevarghese Philoxenos =

Geevarghese Mar Philoxenos
- Metropolitan of Thumpamon Diocese
- Church: Malankara Orthodox Syrian Church
- Appointed: 3 November 1930
- Term ended: 17 April 1951
- Predecessor: Geevarghese Mar Gregorios
- Successor: Augen Mar Themothios
- Previous post: Metropolitan of Thumpamon Diocese

Orders
- Ordination: 1929 by St. Mar Dionysious
- Consecration: 3 November 1930 by Baselios Geevarghese II

Personal details
- Born: Geevarghese Kizhakkethalakal; 10 June 1897 Puthencavu, Kerala
- Died: 17 April 1951 (aged 53) Marathamkode (Kunnamkulam), Kerala

Geevarghese Mar Philoxenos a.k.a. Puthencavil Kochu Thirumeni (born K. T. Geevarghese) was an administrator, orator and an advocate of Orthodox and the Catholicate of the Malankara Orthodox Syrian Church of India. He served as Metropolitan of Thumpamon Diocese from 1930 to 1951.

== Birth ==
Geevarghese Mar Philoxenos was born on 10 June 1897 at Puthencavu, a village on the banks of the River Pamba, as the second son of Thoma Kathanar of Kizhakethallekal family and Rachelamma of Chungathil family of Koipuram.

== Early life and education ==
He was known as Geevarghese as a child and was the second of 4 brothers and 1 sister. He completed his primary education in Puthencavu, middle school education at Mavelikara and high school education at Chengannur. He obtained his Intermediate certificate from Calcutta, and went on to complete his BD at Serampore College, where he had traveled to, along with Fr P T Geevarghese (who later became Geevarghese Mar Ivanios). After completing his Bachelor of Divinity degree, he joined the MD Seminary School as a teacher in 1921. He then went on to complete his MA in English Literature from the Calcutta University in 1926.

== Priestly life and ordination ==
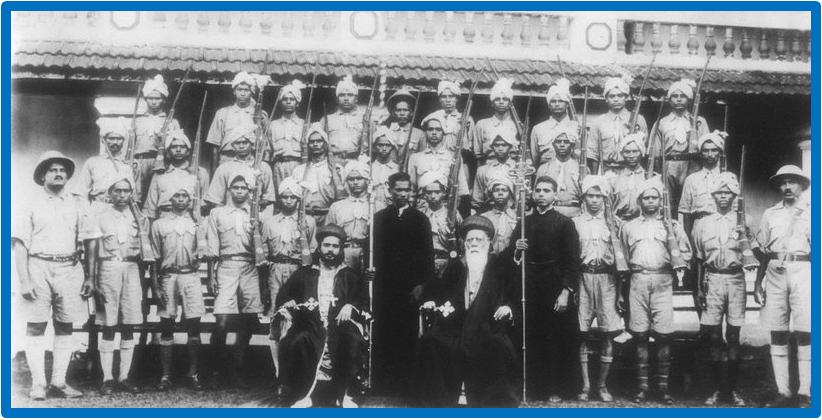
Guard of Honor accorded to Geevarghese Mar Philoxenos and Mar Dionysius at Kunnamkulam

He was ordained as a Deacon and Priest in 1929 by St. Mar Dionysious, who was his mentor. He was ordained as Ramban on 6 November 1929 and consecrated as Bishop with the name Geevarghese Mar Philoxenos, Metropolitan of Thumpamon, at the Parumala Seminary on 3 November 1930 by HH Baselios Geevarghese II. As he was the youngest bishop at the time, he was referred to as 'Kochu Thirumeni'. Following his consecration he served as the Metropolitan of the Thumpamon diocese (of which Parumala Kochu Thirumeni was the Second Metropolitan) from 1931–1951.

== Achievements ==
During his lifetime, Kochu Thirumeni headed many organizations and established many educational institutions:

- Catholicate High School, Pathanamthitta
- Metropolitan High School, Puthencavu, which counts among its alumni eminent personalities such as Justice J B Koshy, among others
- Teachers Training College, Pathanamthitta
- Catholicate College, Pathanamthitta (the college was originally planned by Kochu Thirumeni, but was started after his death)

He also served as the President of the Sunday School, and Gospel Team. Other institutions that he set up include:

- Othera Dayara
- Bethel Aramana The Headquarters of the Chengannur Diocese.
- Pongalady Church (Paranthal)
- Thumpamon Martha Mariam Center
- Theological College, Makkamkunnu
- Eraviperoor Hospital

Kochu Thirumeni was a strong influence on many of the clergy and along with Vattasseril Geevarghese Mar Dionysius persuaded H.H Baselos Marthoma Mathews I to go for Theological studies at Calcutta. He also led the legal battles against Mar Ivanios to regain control over some of the schools which were handed over to the latter for management while Mar Dionysius, undertook a trip to Mardin

== Death ==
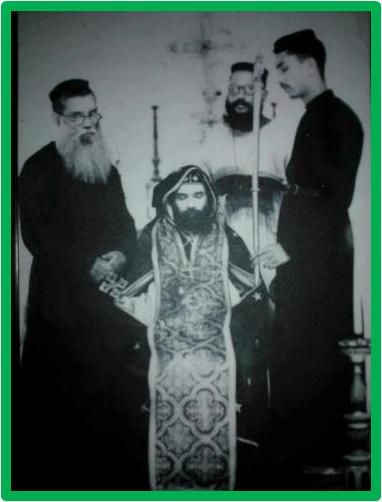
Funeral of Geevarghese Mar Philoxenos

Kochu Thirumeni died on 17 April 1951 at 54, at the Marathamcode Mar Gregorios Chapel, where the room and the bed he used are maintained as relics of his life. His remains were interred at St. Mary's Orthodox Cathedral, Puthencavu where the remains of Mar Thoma VI and Mar Thoma VIII are also entombed.

The following lines are inscribed on his tomb:

His Presence was Joyful,
His Voice Sweet,
His Words Inspiring,
His Manners Endearing,
His Smile Unforgettable.

Kochu Thirumeni's tomb is a pilgrimage destination for Malankara Orthodox Christians.

== Feasts and honors ==
The commemoration feast of Kochu Thirumeni is held on 16 and 17 April every year (usually coinciding with 18th & 19th of Kumbham, as per the Malayalam calendar).

On 17 April 2013, his 62nd Commemoration he was conferred the title of 'Ratna Deepam' of the Catholicate by HH Baselios Marthoma Paulose II, as per the decision of the Episcopal Synod and the declaration was read out by HG Thomas Mar Athanasius, Kochu Thirumeni's Nephew.

== See also ==
- George Mathan
- Puthencavu Mathan Tharakan
