= History and culture of Elavumthitta =

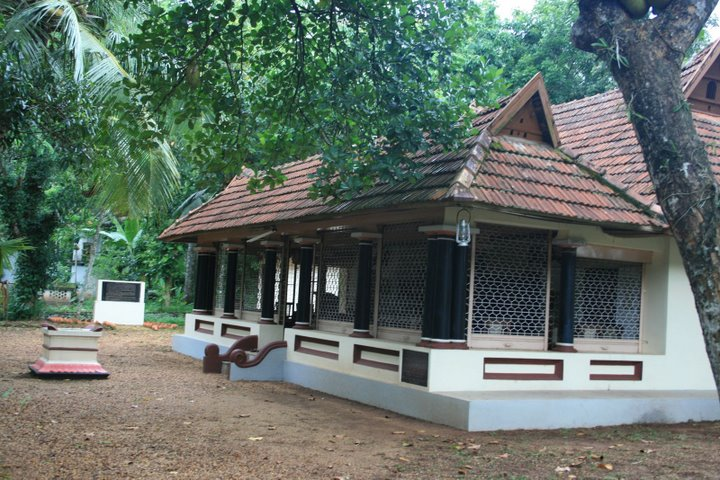
Mooloor memorial.

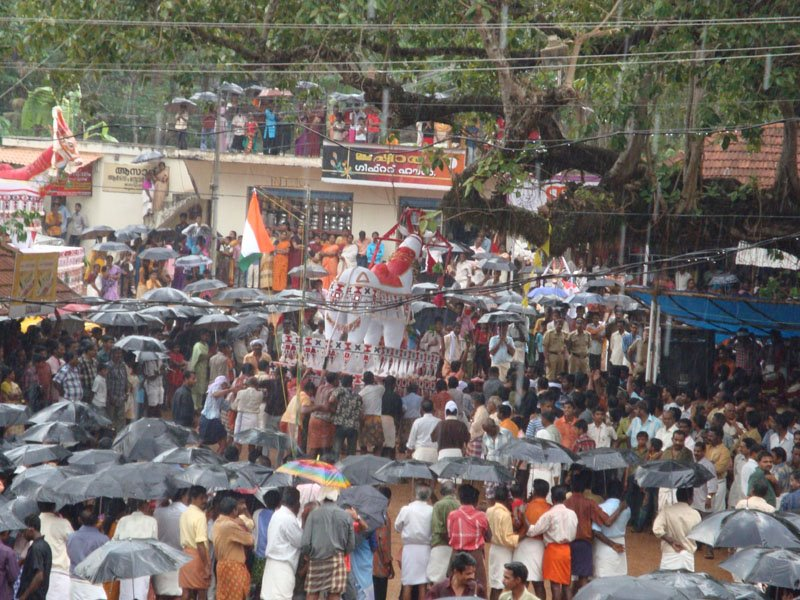
The villagers watching the festival.

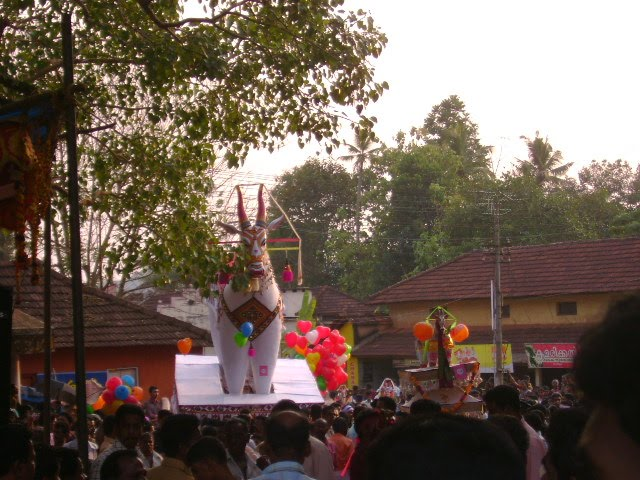
Ashwathy Festival.

Elavumthitta is a village in the Pathanamthitta district of Kerala, India. It is known for its rich cultural and historical background. The village has a tradition of community efforts, including the establishment of the Janatha Library and Reading Room in Muttathukonam. This library, along with a radio funded through a local lottery, has played a significant role in local culture.

Elavumthitta is also known for its association with Muloor S. Padmanabha Panicker, a notable poet and social reformer who contributed to education and social development in the area. The village celebrates the Aswathy festival annually, and the historical cattle market has been a central economic activity for over a century.

The village has made strides in education and infrastructure, with institutions like S.N. Giri S.N.D.P. Higher Secondary School and S.N.D.P. Higher Secondary School, and improvements in roads such as the Thumpamon–Thekkemala Road and T.K. Kunjumman Road. Elavumthitta is also home to various temples, churches, and community centers, reflecting its diverse cultural and religious life.

== Mooloor Panicker ==
The name Elavumthitta is closely associated with Muloor S. Padmanabha Panicker. While many outside Elavumthitta may know him primarily as a notable poet, his impact extends far beyond literature. Mooloor challenged the elitist literary circles of his time, who often dismissed his work and questioned his right to contribute to literature based on his caste. Undeterred, Mooloor, inspired by Sree Narayana Guru, continued his literary and social reforms. His efforts led to significant improvements in Elavumthitta, including advancements in education, infrastructure, and social equality. Nominated to the Sreemulam Prajasabha in 1914 by the Maharaja of Travancore, he worked tirelessly for social justice and development, including the establishment of educational institutions and the shaping of local markets and roads. Mooloor's legacy endures through a memorial built by the Government of Kerala in 1989, which serves as a reminder of his contributions and a place of reverence for literary and educational milestones. The memorial, visited by many annually on Vijayadasami Day, symbolizes his enduring influence and the importance of remembering his contributions to both literature and societal progress.

== Aswathy ==
The most significant annual festival for the people of Elavumthitta is the Aswathy celebration, held in the Malayalam month of Meenam. While Onam is widely celebrated across Kerala, Aswathy is a unique and eagerly anticipated event specifically for Elavumthitta. Children look forward to this festival, saving up their small allowances to spend on the fair. The local cashew harvest adds to the excitement, as the proceeds from selling cashew nuts contribute to the festival experience.

The celebration centers around the Malanada worship site, where the annual festivities honor the deity of the hills. A highlight of the event is the colorful pageantry, featuring large, multicolored oxen figures mounted on wooden platforms and paraded through the streets by enthusiastic locals. The scene is filled with the sounds of percussion instruments and the buzz of the crowd, creating a vibrant atmosphere.

Vendors set up makeshift stalls selling a variety of goods, from colorful glass bangles to balloons and toy bugles. As night falls, the fairgrounds are illuminated by kerosene lamps, casting a warm glow over the festivities. Children, reluctant to leave, are often dragged away by their parents as the crowd disperses. The fair is not only a time for celebration but also a venue for resolving local disputes and showcasing rural arts, culminating in a night of folk performances and fireworks.

== Cattle market ==
Elavumthitta market, locally known as Elavumthitta Chandha (ഇലവുംതിട്ട ചന്ത), celebrated its 100th anniversary in September 2009. A notable landmark in the center of Elavumthitta is a large banyan tree, whose exact age is unknown but is estimated to be over eight hundred years old. This tree has long been a silent witness to the market’s history, providing shade to travelers and observing political events and speeches given by politicians who occasionally use its platform.

The market was once renowned for cattle trading, attracting traders from distant places like Thiruvananthapuram. The ninth day of each Malayalam month was dedicated to cattle trading, with traders arriving a day or two early to secure good positions. Limited space and narrow roads meant that traders would sometimes set up in adjacent vacant lands, either free or for a small fee. Local entrepreneurs would rent out spaces for tying cattle, and tea shops would operate around the clock to cater to the busy crowd. The market day was noisy and chaotic, filled with bargaining, the cries of animals, and the pervasive smell of dung and urine. The cattle market is now held twice a month, on the 9th and 22nd of each Malayalam month, but its significance has diminished compared to earlier days.

== Weekly market ==
In Elavumthitta, market days are held every Wednesday and Saturday. Historically, the local economy was based on agriculture, with no rubber plantations at the time. The area was known for cultivating a variety of crops, including paddy, coconut, cashew, tapioca, pepper, and various fruits and vegetables. The market served not only as a place for buying and selling goods but also as a social hub where people gathered to chat and catch up. Market days were integral to the local rhythm, influencing the scheduling of important tasks and fostering social connections that often led to marriages.

Fish and tapioca were staple foods, and the fish market was particularly significant. Vendors would bring fish from distant coastal areas, transporting them in baskets on bicycles. The market, which peaked around 11:00 a.m. and continued until late afternoon, was a lively scene where people inquired about the day’s fish offerings. Sardines were especially popular and affordable, sometimes selling as cheaply as fifty for 4 annas (about 25 paisa today).

Coconut palms were abundant, and trading coconuts was a major economic activity. On market days, large quantities of coconuts and coconut husks were traded, with husks being sent to other parts of Kerala for coir production. Today, rubber is the main cash crop, with even small landholders maintaining a few rubber trees for income. Seasonal crops like cashew and pepper also had established markets. The weekly market was an open-air affair where a wide range of goods, from clay pots to bamboo baskets, were displayed and sold.

== Sivagiri pilgrimage ==
The Sivagiri pilgrimage, or Sivagiri Teerthadanam, began in 1932 in Elavumthitta. The initial pilgrims included P.K. Divakara Panicker, P.K. Kesavan, P.V. Raghavan, M.K. Raghavan, and S. Sankunni, all of whom were from Elavumthitta.

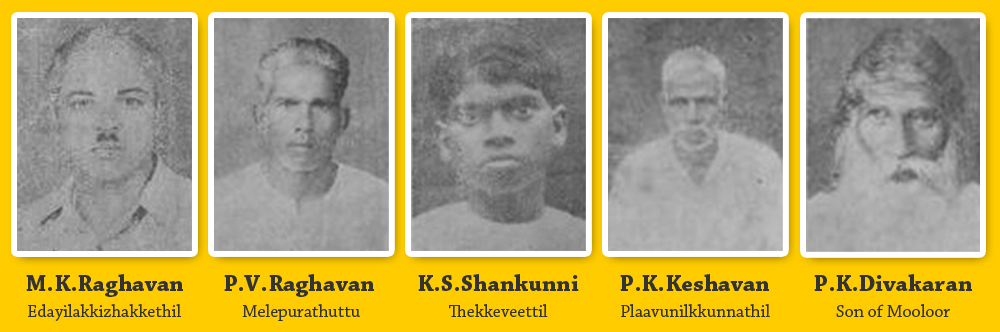

== Mooloor S. Padmanābha Panicker ==
Mooloor S. Padmanābha Panicker, also known as Sarasa Kavi Mooloor, was a distinguished poet and social reformer from Travancore. Born in 1869 at Panayannaarkavu near Mannar in Central Travancore, he named his home in Elavumthitta Kerala Varma Soudham in honor of his close friend, Kerala Varma Valiyakoyi Thampuran.

=== Mooloor Smarakom ===
In 1989, the State Government renamed Kerala Varma Soudham as Sarasa Kavi Mooloor Smarakam. Managed by the State Department of Culture, this monument is dedicated to educating the public about Mooloor’s significant contributions to literature and social reform, and preserving his legacy.

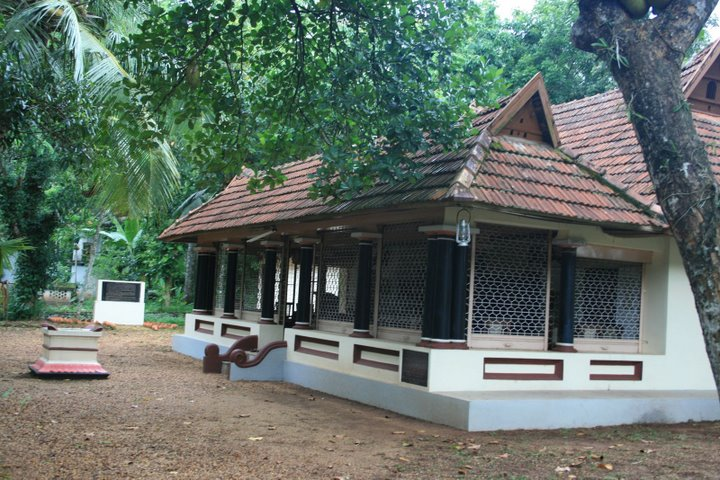
Mooloor Smarakam

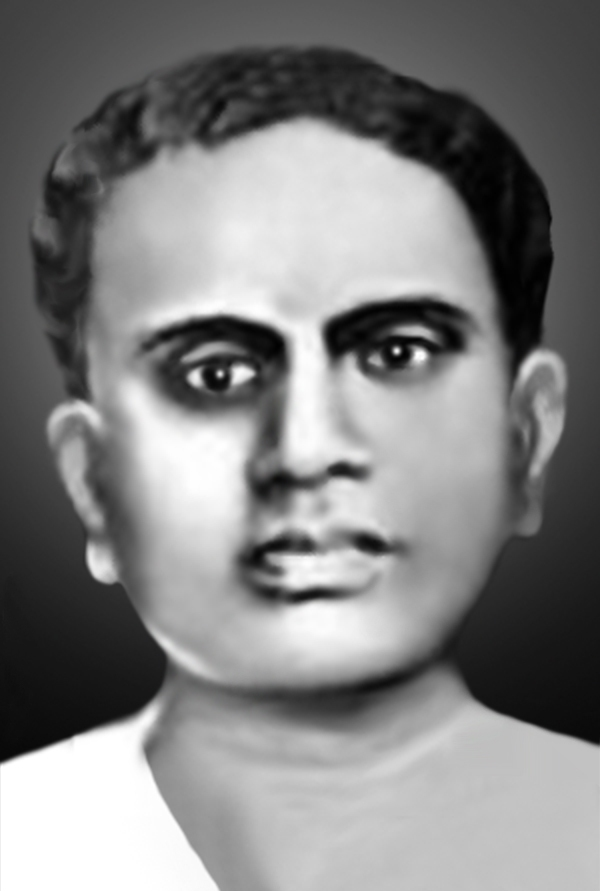
Mooloor S.Padmanabha Panickar

=== Ezhuthiniruthu ===
Mooloor Smarakam is also well-known for hosting Ezhuthiniruthu, a special ceremony held on Vijayadasami where children are introduced to the world of letters. This annual event features prominent personalities and is celebrated at Mooloor Smarakam.

== Thumpamon–Thekkemala road ==
=== Elavumthitta gets government bus service in 1957 ===
There was a time when the people of Elavumthitta relied solely on walking to travel outside their village, whether for medical help, school, or college. Distances were measured in "nazhika," roughly equivalent to one mile. Students often walked 30 km to Thiruvalla for college and then back home in the evening, a grueling task.

Connecting Elavumthitta to other places by public transport was challenging. The road from Ambalakadavu Junction in Thumpamon to Elavumthitta was very narrow and mostly a cart track in the 1950s. The nearest bus was at Thekkemala Junction near Kozhencherry.

In the early 1950s, bridges were constructed near Punnakkad on the Thekkemala-Elavumthitta road, and additional bridges and culverts were built south of Elavumthitta near Ramanchira. The roadwork included heavy filling in paddy fields, managed by contractor Mr. M.G. George of Mannil, Nellanikunnu. In 1954, a private bus service called "DAILY EXPRESS" began operating from Kallisseri to Omalloor.

The push for a government transport bus service gained momentum with the newly elected government. Kambisseril Sankaran Vaidyan, then president of Mezhuveli Panchayat, used his influence to secure a bus route from the Transport Minister M.N. Govindan Nair. The condition for this was that the local road needed to be made motorable. Government officials surveyed the route and recommended road improvements, which were to be carried out by the local community at their own expense.

Sankaran Vaidyan organized volunteers to work on the road, but faced resistance from a landowner near Ramanchira, who sought a court stay and police protection. Despite the landowner's objections, hundreds of locals with tools and determination gathered to start the work. When a police inspector arrived to halt the effort, Vaidyan offered him a cigarette and encouraged the workers to continue. The collective effort and determination of the people led to the fulfillment of their long-awaited dream: a public transport bus service for Elavumthitta.

=== T.K. Kunjumman road ===
In 1948, Adv. V.K. Varghese, a CSI church member and MLA of Pathanamthitta, highlighted the urgent need for a motorable road from Elavumthitta to Omalloor to the PWD authorities. Thekkethil Sri. Kunjumman led the initiative to widen the road and establish bus service in the area. As Panchayat President of Chenneerkkara for several terms, Kunjumman also played a key role in securing a Primary Health Centre for Elavumthitta. Sri. Kuzhimannil K.C. Kurien donated the land for this health centre.

Additionally, the need for a veterinary hospital became evident as the local population, primarily agricultural farmers, kept many cattle. Under Kunjumman's leadership, the community successfully lobbied for a veterinary hospital, which began operations in 1960 thanks to land donated by Vadakkedethu Sri. V.T. Chaco. In recognition of Kunjumman’s significant contributions, the government named the Elavumthitta–Omalloor road "T.K. Kunjumman Road."

== Arts and sports ==
=== Azad Arts and sports club ===
In earlier days, the people of Elavumthitta had little entertainment beyond the annual "Aswathi Maholsavam" festival. Cinema halls were 10 to 20 km away, and there was no reliable bus service to get there and back. Some adventurous locals would make the trek to Pathanamthitta, Pandalam, Kozhencherry, or Chengannur to watch popular films, often sneaking back home under the cover of night to avoid the disapproval of their elders. In those times, it was common for anyone to chastise the youth, and this often had the tacit approval of parents.

The impact of KPAC drama, which effectively spread revolutionary ideas for social change, was keenly observed by the educated and progressive youth of Elavumthitta. On the evening of 26 January 1957, while the rest of the country was celebrating Republic Day, Elavumthitta marked the occasion uniquely by founding the Azad Arts and Sports Club, named in honor of the freedom fighter Maulana Abulkalam Azad. The name was suggested by Sri. C. Chandra Dattan, MA. A meeting was held at the SNDP Hall in Nediyakala, about one and a half km from Elavumthitta market. Attendees included Mr. Chandra Dattan, Mr. V.R. Gopinathan Nair, Mr. C.A. Gangadharan, T.K. Sadanandan, P.K. Gangadharan, A.D. Kuttappanachari, and Mr. Satyapalan. The club’s mission was to promote arts and sports in Elavumthitta, with Mr. C. Chandra Dattan as President, Mr. V.R. Gopinathan Nair as Secretary, and Mr. A.D. Kuttappanachari as Vice President.

The club quickly gained popularity, with nearly everyone in Elavumthitta becoming a member. Prominent Kerala artists, such as Sri. Ayroor Sadasivan and Kottayam Joy, performed alongside local Azad Club artists. The club organized classes for classical music, tabla, and harmonium, and had talented members like Mooloor Balachandran, V.R. Gopinathan Nair, and Salim Kambisseril who brought fame to the club throughout Kerala.

Azad Club even had its own ballet troupe and a professional drama troupe that performed in various parts of Kerala, including remote areas like Kumali. The club’s motto was to present a new drama every month. Azad was also active in radio drama, producing about 15 radio dramas with contributions from writers and performers like Mr. V.R. Gopinathan Nair, Mr. Salim Kambisseril, Mr. P.K. Sahadevan, E.N. Gangadharan, E.R. Rajan, C.A. Gangadharan, and P.N. Ramachandran.

The club featured dancers like C.R. Das, U.N. Sreedharan Kutty, Peter, John Philip, Johnson, Joy, and makeup artist Mr. Mathai. Artist Kesavan designed the club’s curtains, and Mr. K. Madhavan and Kambisseril Sankaran Vaidyan were prominent patrons. The club had its office in a three-room building near the famous Banyan tree in Elavumthitta. Although many of the founders are no longer with us, the building remains a testament to the club’s glorious past.

=== Youth clubs in Elavumthitta ===
- Mooloor Jyothis Arts & Sports Club, Ayathil (Affiliation No. C-001)
- Azad Arts & Sports Club, Elavumthitta (Affiliation No. C-002)
- Sariga Arts & Sports Club, Planthottathukala (Affiliation No. C-004)
- Sangeetha Arts Club, Nediyakala (Affiliation No. C-006)
- Sahridaya Vedi, Sahridaya Nagar (Affiliation No. C-007)
- Janasakthi Sports Club, Nediyakala (Affiliation No. C-008)
- Suvarna Kala Samskarika Samithi, Ayathil (Affiliation No. C-010)
- Soorya Arts & Sports Club, Muttathukonam

== Libraries in and around Elavumthitta ==
In 1950, India was still emerging from the shadow of colonial rule. During this time, reading and discussing new ideas were often viewed with skepticism by many elders, who considered such activities a waste of time. People were focused on survival, with daily life demanding hard work just to make ends meet. Roads, schools, hospitals, and other necessities were yet to be established, and the scarcity of resources made even basic amenities like newspapers a luxury. Malayalam weekly magazines were highly sought after, and people would contribute a few paisa each to buy them, with each issue costing just two annas (equivalent to today’s twelve paisa). Radios and cinema halls were far off luxuries, not easily accessible due to financial constraints.

Amidst this backdrop, the youth of Muttathukonam were eager for change and new ideas. Books offered an escape and a way to dream beyond their daily struggles. The desire for a library took shape among like-minded individuals in Muttathukonam, but the project needed a push to become reality. News that the government might establish a rural library in the Elavumthitta area sparked a sense of urgency. Nearby areas competed to host the library, with a "first come, first served" approach in play.

One afternoon, the people of Muttathukonam were startled by the sound of a continuous bell tolling from the S.N.D.P. building. Fearing the worst, they gathered for an emergency meeting. It was announced that a government official would visit soon to evaluate library activities, and a room with a shelf, bench, desk, and ideally a wooden chair and table needed to be prepared. A key question arose: what about the books?

In a moment of determination, Mr. T.M. Varghese of Thundiyathu volunteered to arrange the books if someone could assist him. Knowing Mr. Varghese’s reliability, others quickly stepped up. Mr. Kunjukunju of Mylamootil agreed to help, and Sri. Kunjukunju Thandar of Thaninilkkunnathil offered space in the S.N.D.P. building for the library. The community rallied together, offering items like a wooden bench, a three-legged table, and more, ensuring that everything needed for a modest library was provided.

The dedication of individuals like T.M. Varghese, Mylamootil Kunjukunju, and Thaninilkkunnathil Kunjukunju Thandar was instrumental in establishing the Janatha Library and Reading Room. They collected old books from every household, even those without covers, and worked hard to create the library. When the inspector visited, he was impressed with the preparations, and thus, Muttathukonam proudly inaugurated its library. The efforts of these pioneers, who are no longer with us, are fondly remembered and celebrated.

== Library gets a radio ==
By 1960, many libraries in wealthier areas had their own radios. Muttathukonam, however, lagged behind and wanted to catch up. Back then, a radio cost around Rs. 500, which was a significant amount for the local community. Despite several meetings, no progress was made until someone proposed raising funds through a lottery. The idea was well-received, and thus, Muttathukonam's first lottery was organized. Tickets were priced at 4 annas (equivalent to 25 paisa today), and the top prize was an alarm clock, a prized item at the time.

Young volunteers, often on empty stomachs and parched throats, canvassed every corner of Muttathukonam with lottery tickets. Conversations inevitably turned to the lottery, and everyone secretly hoped to win the clock. One grandmother, unfamiliar with clocks, worried that her grandchildren would break it, believing it might be made of paper!

The lottery day arrived, and names were drawn from a basket. The winner was revealed, ending months of speculation and excitement, though many faces showed disappointment. The funds raised were just shy of the amount needed for a radio, but the community applauded the effort.

A favorable date was chosen, and Mr. Dharmapala Panicker from Nediyakalayil was tasked with purchasing the radio from Pathanamthitta. A week later, a Murphy Radio with a valve set and a magic eye was acquired. A notice was placed above the radio, instructing that only authorized personnel could operate it.

The new radio became a focal point of the library, drawing crowds eager to listen to film songs and news broadcasts from Ceylon radio. The library's radio played a key role in sparking cultural change in Muttathukonam.

== Educational institutions ==
- Sreebuddha College of Engineering for Women
- Salvation Army L P School, Thumpamon North: Established in 1903, this was the first school in Elavumthitta, celebrating its centenary in 2003. The land for the school was donated by Sri. Neelakanta Pillai of Alakkatu, who also became the first headmaster. Located 1 km from Elavumthitta market along Ramanchira Road, the school has a long history of contributing to the education of the local community.
- S N Giri S N D P H S S, Chenneerkkara: Founded in 1953 near the Siva temple managed by SNDP Union Branch No. 89, this school’s origins are linked to historical visits from Adhishankaran and Shaktibhadran, the latter inspiring the school's name. The initial efforts were led by Sri. P K Kamalasanan, with significant contributions from Kerala Kaumudi Editor K Sukumaran. In 1998, the school was upgraded to a Higher Secondary School, thanks to the dedication of several managers. It serves around 1,000 students with a staff of 46 teachers and 7 support staff.
- S N D P H S S, Muttathukonam North: Established in 1948 as a Lower Primary School with contributions from the local community, including donations of coconuts and voluntary labor. The school evolved into an Upper Primary School in 1956 and a High School in 1962, with Sri. R Shankar, the then education minister, laying the foundation stone. Upgraded to a Higher Secondary School in 2000-01, it serves about 1,000 students with 50 teachers and 8 support staff. The school is known for its computer lab, science lab, and a spacious, well-ventilated campus. It also gained recognition for its women's volleyball teams in the 1980s.
- CMS High School, Kuzhikkala
- Padmanabhodayam H S S, Mezhuveli
- Gangadhara Vilasam L P School, Mezhuveli
- Teachers Training Institute, Mezhuveli
- Govt. Model L P School, Mezhuveli North
- U P School, Mezhuveli North
- S N Govt. L P School, Kooduvettikkal, Karithotta
- Govt. of India Women's ITI, Elavumthitta
- Sarasakavi Mooloor Smaraka U P School, Chandanakkunnu
- Ambedkar English Medium School
- Mezhuveli Panchayat ITC
- CMS U P School, Nallanikunnu
- Sree Buddha Central School, CBSC, Ayathil

== Temples and Churches in and around Elavumthitta ==
- Elavumthitta Bhagavathy Temple
- Elavumthitta Malanada
- Kayyamthadam Njaranmala Kavu
- Ayathil Malanada
- Mezhuveli Anandabhootheshwaram Temple
- Aranmula Sree Parthasarathi Temple
- Omalloor Raktha Kanda Swamy Temple
- Pandalam Valiya Koickal Sree Dharma Sastha Temple
- Kulakkada Sreemahadeva Temple
- Christ the King Catholic Church, Elavinthitta: Established on 4 November 1936. Daily Mass: 6:30 a.m.; Sunday: 8:30 a.m.
- Kuzhikkala Marthoma Church
- Manjinikkara Church
- Bethlehem Marthoma Church
- St. Paul's CSI Church, Nallanikunnu
- Malankara Catholic Church
- Sehion Mar Thoma Church
- Thabor Mar Thoma Church, Pullamala
- Jerusalem Mar Thoma Church, Ayathil
- Ebenezer Marthoma Church, Chenneerkara

== Gurumandirams in and around Elavumthitta ==
Sree Narayana Guru, the revered saint and social reformer of Kerala, played a crucial role in transforming the lives of the people in Elavumthitta. Known for his deep connection with Mooloor Padmanabha Panicker, Guru frequently visited Mooloor's home in Elavumthitta. He was a visionary who understood that education was key to overcoming deep-seated prejudices and irrational beliefs. Advocating for a unified society, he famously proclaimed, "One caste, one religion, one god for all." To spread his philosophy, Guru encouraged the creation of prayer halls where people could come together in harmony, regardless of caste or religion. These prayer halls, known as Guru Mandirams, were established across Kerala. Here are the Guru Mandirams in and around Elavumthitta:

- Ayathil: Located in the compound of the present Mooloor Smarakam. This Gurumandiram, over fifty years old, was built by Sri. P. K. Divakara Panicker, who raised funds by selling part of his property.
- Ayathil Jn.: Opened on 27 August 1977, and inaugurated by Sri. K. K. Viswanathan, the then Governor of Gujarat.
- Ampalathumpattu: Opened in 1980 and managed by the Poura Samathy (Citizen Forum) of the area.
- Elavumthitta: Inaugurated by Adv. K. Gopinathan on 26 March 1982.
- Chenneerkara: Opened in 1985.
- Muttathukonam: Opened on 26 December 1978. The installation proceedings were conducted by Sri. Gopalan Thantri, father of the famous singers Jaya-Vijayan brothers. A notable event was a dance program scheduled on the final day of the celebration, which was disrupted by heavy rain and strong winds. Despite this, the dance troupe performed the next day.
- Mayikunnu (Panil Area)
- Mezhuveli
- Nediyakala Jn.: The foundation was laid by Sri. V. M. Madhavan on 10 October 1948 (Malayalam year 25-03 1124), on Mahanavami day. It took nine years to complete, and it was inaugurated by Nitiya Chaithaniya Yati, a well-known philosopher and follower of Guru's ideologies, on 8 September 1957 (Malayalam year 23-01-1133). The idol of Guru was sculpted by the famous artist A. K. Achari. It is said to be the second Gurumandiram established in Kerala, the first being in Thalasseri.
- Pullamala: Opened on 14 April 1988. The land for this Mandiram was donated by the Kodankalayil family.
- Ramanchira
- Thumpamon-Kalavedi
- Thundukadu

== Writers and litterateurs ==
- Mooloor S Padmanabha Panicker
- Kambisseri Karunakaran
- Suresh Gangadharan

== See also ==
- Mooloor S.Padmanabha Panicker
- K. C. Rajagopalan (EX. MLA, Aranmula)
- P. N. Chandrasenan (Ex. MLA, Aranmula)
- Kambisseri Karunakaran (Chief Editor Janayugam)
