= Mezhuveli Temple =

Mezhuveli Anandabhootheshawaram Temple
- Anandabhootheshwaram Temple, Mezhuveli, Pathanamthitta, Kerala

Religion
- Affiliation: Hinduism
- District: Pathanamthitta
- Deity: Mahadeva
- Festival: Maha Shivaratri

Location
- Location: Mezhuveli
- State: Kerala
- Country: India
- Interactive map of Mezhuveli Anandabhootheshawaram Temple
- Coordinates: 9°16′24.2″N 76°41′33.0″E

Architecture
- Temple: One

Mezhuveli Anandabhootheshawaram Temple is a famous Lord Shiva Temple situated at the heart of Mezhuveli village in Pathanamthitta District. This temple was built by the villagers under the leadership of famous social reformer and poet Sri. Muloor S.Padmanabha Panicker and consecrated by Sree Narayana Guru.

This century-old temple was built on a place called 'Tholekavu' which was surrounded by a small hill called 'Meenchirakkal Hill' on the southern side, 'Ambottimodi' also called 'Kailasam' on the east, a beautiful stream flowing on the western side near "Pottanmala" and at the north side "Padmanabhan Kunnu", a small hill. Tholekavu was a small forest, which is believed to be a part of the Pandalam Kingdom.

Sree Mahadevan is the principal deity worshipped here. Ganapathi, Subramanian, Devi, Shasthavu, Nagarajavu and Nagayakshi, Brahmarakhshassu are also worshipped here as upadevatas. A separate Guru Mandir is situated inside the temple for Sree Naryana Guru, who did the consecration of this temple. An arayaal tree is also situated inside the temple premises. Main offerings are Neyvilakku, Jaladhaara, Mrityunjaya Pushpanjali along with all other vedasooktha archanas and pushpanjalis. All other important poojas including Ganapathi Homam, Neeranjanam etc. can be done here very well, properly and effectively. Important days of visit are Mondays and Saturdays considering Shiva Pooja.

== See also ==
- Muloor S.Padmanabha Panicker
- Temples of Kerala
- Pathanamthitta District
- Pandalam

Ayyappa temple situated about 8 km from Mezhuveli
