= George Mathan =

Anglican priest

Successor of St. Thomas the Apostle Rev. George Mathan Tharakan
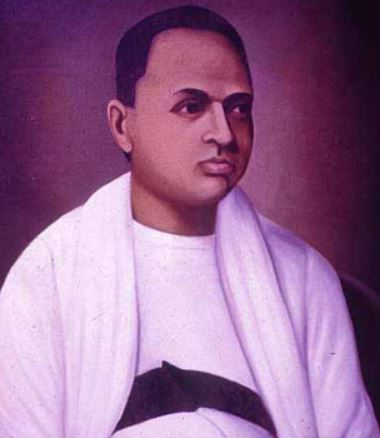

Personal details
- Born: 25 September 1819 Kidangannoor, Travancore
- Died: 4 March 1870 (aged 50)
- Denomination: Anglicanism

Rev. George Mathan Tharakan (25 September 1819 – 4 March 1870), a.k.a. Geevarghese Kathanar or Mallapallil Achen (Malayalam: ജോർജ്ജ് മാത്തൻ), was a Saint Thomas Anglican priest (Kathanar), Malayalam grammarian and writer of the 19th century Kerala.

== Early life and education ==
George was born on 25 September 1819 into the Puliyelil family in the village of Kidangannoor, Kerala as the son of Chengannur Puthencavu Kizhakkethalackal Mathan Tharakan and Puthencavu Puthenveettil Annamma. His great-grandfather Cherian and his grandfather Chummar had received special privileges (Tharakan title) from the Travancore king, as they were a wealthy family who supported the royalty in times of need.

From childhood, he had shown great aptitude for learning. Since George's father, Mathan had died at a very early age, his uncle Rev. Kurian Kathanar took charge of his education.

Inspired by Kurian Kathanar, he became a deacon and Kathanar of the undivided Malankara Syrian Church.

Later, he received an offer from the C.M.S Anglican missionaries to pursue university education at the newly opened Madras University at Madras. He accepted the offer and after graduating from Madras University, he became an Anglican priest. He was the first ordained native priest of the Anglican church in South India.

== Ministry ==
George first started his ministry in the Mallapally area of Travancore and became known as "Mallapallil Achen," meaning father of Mallapally. He was instrumental in converting the first lower-caste family (headed by a man named Habel) to Christianity in Mallapally. This day is celebrated even today in Kerala as Habel's Day. This family's conversion into Anglican Christianity encouraged the conversion of a large number of lower-caste people into the faith.

Rev. George Mathan was also a contemporary of Hermann Gundert, a German priest, who wrote the first dictionary in Malayalam. Hermann Gundert is grandfather of Nobel Prize–winning writer Hermann Hesse, author of novels such as Siddhartha (novel). Historically, he is also a contemporary of great writers like Mark Twain and Charles Dickens. Rev. George has been honoured by the Kerala Sahitya Akademi (the central body of Malayalam literature) by being included in the list of prominent Malayalam literary figures on their website. A short history of his literary oeuvres can be found here and his life history can be found here in the Kerala Sahitya Akademi website.

While ministering to the people, a full-time job, George found time to write erudite treatises on grammar and local culture. He wrote the first book of Malayalam grammar called "Malayazhmayude Vyakaranam," which was published in 1863. This grammar book was acknowledged and recommended by the then government as the most authoritative volume on grammar of the Malayalam language. His other books, sort of longish essays, include, "Satyavadakhedam," "Vedasamyukthi," and "Balabhyasam."

Rev. George Mathan was also a keen educationist. He helped collect funds to build the Cambridge Nicholson Institute (CNI) and oversaw the construction of its building and facilities. Later on, he became the principal of the CNI, which was instrumental in spreading English-medium education throughout the state of Kerala.

The Malayalam poet and littérateur Mahakavi Ulloor S. Parameswara Iyer (who is considered Kerala's (Malayalam's) finest poets along with Kumaran Asan, and Vallathol) stated "All in all, George Mathan built a permanent framework for Malayalam literature and thus made all Malayalis (people of Kerala) indebted to him, this fact is beyond dispute."

== Death ==
Rev. George Mathan died on 4 March 1870. He is interred at St. Thomas CSI church Thalavady.

== Legacy ==
- The Rev. George Mathen Mission Hospital at Mallapally is dedicated to his memory and offers medical services to the people in that region.
- A memorial lecture conducted at Bishop Moore College, Mavelikkara is also dedicated to his memory.
