= Mahakavi =

The word Mahakavi or Maha Kavi is an Indian honorific which means "Great Poet" in Sanskrit. This may refer to:

== Poets ==
- Kālidāsa, 5th-century Sanskrit playwright and epic poet, popularly known as "Mahakavi Kalidasa"
- Bharavi, 6th century Sanskrit poet
- Bāṇabhaṭṭa, 7th-century Sanskrit writer and poet
- Bhavabhuti, 8th-century Sanskrit poet, and playwright
- Magha (poet), 7th century Sanskrit poet
- Chakrapani Dasa, 9th century Sanskrit poet
- Shriharsha, 12th century Sanskrit philosopher-poet
- Janna, known as Mahakavi Janna, 13th-century Kannada poet
- Krittibas Ojha
- Vidyapati (1352–1448), also known as Maithil Kavi Kokil (the poet cuckoo of Maithili language), Maithili poet and Sanskrit writer
- Kshetrayya (c. 1600–1680) Telugu poet of songs for Krishna
- Subramania Bharati (1882–1921), Tamil writer, poet and journalist, and Indian independence activist and social reformer from Tamil Nadu, popularly known as "Mahakavi Bharathi", he was a pioneer of modern Tamil poetry and is considered one of the greatest Tamil literary figures of all time
- Ayodhya Singh Upadhyay (1865–1947), modern Hindi poet
- Moyinkutty Vaidyar (1852–1892), Muslim Malayalam poet of the Mappila pattu genre
- Kumaran Asan (1873–1924), one of the modern triumvirate poets of Malayalam
- Ulloor S. Parameswara Iyer (1877–1949), one of the modern triumvirate poets of Malayalam
- Vallathol Narayana Menon (1878–1958), one of the modern triumvirate poets of Malayalam
- K.V. Simon (1883–1944), Christian Malayalam poet, Sanskrit scholar and polyglot
- Puthencavu Mathan Tharakan (1903–1993), Christian Malayalam poet
- P. C. Devassia (1906–2006), Christian Sanskrit scholar and poet
- Laxmi Prasad Devkota (1909–1959), Nepali poet
- Gurajada Apparao (1862-1915), playwright, dramatist, poet, and writer; his play Kanyasulkam is considered as the greatest play in the Telugu language
- Dasu Sriramulu (1846-1908), scholar, dramatist, poet, orator and writer. Author of several literary works - kavyalu, satakas, plays, lyrics for musical and dance compositions
- Sri Sri (writer) (1910-1983), Telugu poet and lyricist who is known for his works in Telugu literature and films. Noted for his anthology Maha Prasthanam

== Others ==
- Mahakavi (TV series), a 2016 Indian television documentary about Hindi poets hosted by poet Kumar Vishwas
