= Kidangannoor =

Kidangannoor Kidangannur
- village
- Location in Kerala, India Kidangannoor (India)
- Coordinates: 9°17′45″N 76°41′0″E
- Country: India
- State: Kerala
- District: Pathanamthitta

Population (2011)
  - Total: 14,264

Languages
  - Official: Malayalam, English
- Time zone: UTC+5:30 (IST)
- PIN: 689514
- Vehicle registration: KL-
- Nearest city: Thiruvalla, Kozhencherry, Pandalam

Kidangannoor is a town in the extreme west end of Pathanamthitta district in the state of Kerala, India. It is on the route between Aranmula (famous for its boat races) and Pandalam. It is well connected to various places such as Thiruvalla(20 km),Chengannur (9.5 km), Pandalam (9.5 km), Aranmula (4 km), Kozhencherry (8 km), Pathanamthitta (18 km) by different roads. It is one of the fastest-growing villages in Kerala. It is about 2 km from the border of Pathanamthitta & Alappuzha districts( Elimukku junction). It is about 4.5 km east of Mulakkuzha from MC road.

== Demographics ==
As of the 2011 India census, Kidangannur had a population of 14,264 with 6,486 males and 7,778 females. There have been many NRI (Non-resident Indian and person of Indian origin) resulting in not only improved quality of life and rise of money in many households but has left some elderly people alone and resulted in a decline in workers.

== Notable people ==
Kidangannoor is located at Thiruvabharana Patha of Lord Ayyappan. It is 4 km away from Aranmula. Pallimukathu Devi Temple is at Kidangannoor. It is the birthplace of the father of modern Malayalam, Rev. George Mathan. Mathan wrote the first grammar book in Malayalam called "Malayanmayude Vyakaranam" and other books like "Satyavadakhedam", "Marumakkathaya Sampradayam" and many others. He did most of his writing in his ancestral house in Kidangannoor, although he spent most of his life in Mallapally and Kottayam. He worked tirelessly with Rev.Hermann Gundert and other priests to save Malayalam from the onslaught of Tamil, which was the official language in Kerala at that time.

== Education ==
Kidangannoor offers a mix of government and private schools catering to various educational needs. Government LPS Kidangannoor is a primary school providing education from grades 1 to 4. For higher secondary education, there is the well-regarded SVGV Higher Secondary School, known for its academic achievements and participation in Kerala School Kalolsavam.

== Trivia ==
The village's other attractions are proximity to Aranmula(4 km) and Sabarimala(85 km) (both holy places of pilgrimage and worship for Hindus), the Syrian Christian Orthodox Pilgrimage Center and Church, nearby Mezhuveli, a local market, schools, etc. Syrian St.Mathias CSI Church Kidangannur is situated nearby and all the church members are relation of Rev. George Mathan, the puliyelil family as its members. There is a Mar Thoma Church near the junction christened as St. Thom Mar Thoma Church, Kidangannur, which falls under the jurisdiction of Chengannur- Mavelikara Diocese of Mar Thoma Church. A dedication center called Navdarshan is also run by the diocese. St. George Salem Jacobite Syrian Church is also located in Mezhuveli.

The majority of the residents are Christians and Hindus. Therefore, religious festivals of Christians and Hindus are observed every year. Worth mentioning are the festivals in the Syrian Christian Churches (Jacobites and Orthodox) at Mezhuveli with its kathina fireworks and rally which is observed every year with great fanfare. The Hindu temple festivals are also conducted every year with great pomp and fanfare.

The village used to grow many crops, but since the late 1900s there have been mostly rubber farms with only small gardens and areas growing other crops. The village was also affected by 2018 Kerala Floods.

== See also ==
- George Mathan
- Perumkunnil Junction
- Sabarimala
