= Pulinthitta =

Ancient family from Kerala, India

Pulinthitta (പുളിന്തിട്ട) is one of the ancient families in Elanthoor in Pathanamthitta District of the Indian state of Kerala. Their ancestors migrated from Kuravilangad in the 17th century. A historical record shows that people moved from Kuravilangad to Elanthoor. A village named Pulinthitta is locate on the Adoor to Puthiyakavi, about at about 16km on the Kollam to Kayamkulam route.

The Pulinthitta family lived in the western part of Elanthoor village. The original Pulinthitta house existed until recently as a symbol of the family's heritage. Initially Elanthoor was under the domination of Omalloor landlords. These landlords and their ladies used to visit Aranmula Temple, traveling through Elanthoor. Some villagers assaulted the royal women. The eldest ancestor of Pulinthitta family assisted the victims.

The family spread to Kuzhikkala, Elavumthitta, Valliyayanthi, Mezhuveli, Kulathoopuzha and Nalkalikkal. Agriculture was ancestors main occupation. The family practises religious education and spiritual exhortation.

The Pulinthitta comprise around 200 families in three branches. Every year on 1 May the "Kudumbayogam" (Family Conference) is conducted at any of the family member's house. Gulf branch also conducts "Kudumbayogam".

There are many well known dignitaries in Pulinthitta family.

The prefix ‘Pulinthitta’ is added to the house name of some families in Elanthoor.
