= Tharakan (title) =

Honorific hereditary title used in Kerala, India

Tharakan. The title of Tharakan is an honorific hereditary title which was bestowed upon a few prominent Saint Thomas Christian and Knanaya families in the former Kingdoms of Travancore and Cochin, currently the State of Kerala in India.

== Etymology ==
The word Tharakan literally means the holder of document of Raja. They are so called because they were the recipients of Tharaku or writ of social privilege.

== Historical Tharakans ==
Thachil Mathoo (18th/19th century), was an influential Syrian Catholic tharakan from the town of Alangad. He was given the rank of tharakan and served as the minister of the Kingdom of Travancore. Mathoo is noted to have greatly supported the mission of Mar Ouseph Kariattil to Rome in order to express tribulations of the Syrian Catholics to the pope.

=== Knanaya Tharakans ===
Kuriakose Kunnassery (16th century), was an important Knanaya Tharakan from the town of Kaduthuruthy. Kunnassery was a tharakan of the Kingdom of Vadakkumkur and served as a minister at its capitol of Kaduthurthy. In 1550, the Kingdom of Cochin allied with the Portuguese had won a battle against the Kingdom of Vadakkumkur, subsequently slaying its king Veera Manikatachan. Blaming the Syrian Christians as co-religionists of the Portuguese, the remaining army of Vadakkumkur hunted the Syrians after the death of their king. Kunnassery is most noted for leading the mass exodus of the Syrian Christians in Kaduthurthy to the town of Mulanthuruthy in order to escape the rage of the Vadakkumkur army. Upon arriving to Mulanthuruthy, Kunnassery sanctioned the rebuilding of Mulanthuruthy St. Thomas Church.

Pachikara Punnoose (17th century), was an influential Knanaya tharakan from the town of Chunkom. Punnoose is most noted for his actions after the Koonan Kurishu Satyam in 1653. During this time period the Portuguese missionaries were strongly attempting to reunite the Saint Thomas Christians under the Roman Authority of the Catholic Church. After the Koonan Kurishu Satyam, the Thomas Christians had largely remained in rebellion from the Portuguese missionaries, swearing to only abide by their native hierarch and communal head Archdeacon Thomas, now ordained as Mar Thoma I. Punnoose and the majority of the Knanaya community (except for Anjilimootil Ittythommen and Kallisserry church) had remained staunchly faithful to the Portuguese hierarchs, viewing Thoma's ordination as invalid. Punnoose would meet with Bishop Joseph Sebastiani in 1663 who was sent by Rome to reconcile the Saint Thomas Christians into the Catholic fold. Punnoose Tharakan would pledge the support of the Knanaya community and work closely with Sebastiani to ordain Mar Thoma I's cousin and rival Mar Chandy Parambil Parambil would become the be ordained the first Syrian Catholic bishop of the Saint Thomas Christians at Kaduthuruthy Knanaya Valiyapally on February 1, 1663.

Poothathil Ittikuruvilla (18th century), was a wealthy Knanaya Tharakan from the town of Neendoor. Ittikuruvilla was a tharakan of the Kingdom of Travancore and a spice merchant. Ittikuruvilla is most noted for his support and funding of the mission of Mar Ouseph Kariatill and Mar Thoma Paremmakkal to Rome in 1778 in order to hear the grievances of the Syrian Catholics of Kerala. Ittikuruvilla is noted to have paid 30,000 chakrams to finance the journey of the two priests. The mission of the two priests began from Ittikuruvilla's home in Neendoor, from which they travelled on his country boat to the coast of India.

== See also ==
- Saint Thomas Christians
- Tharakan (Hindu Caste)

== Sources ==
- Karukaparambil, George (2005). Marganitha Kynanaitha: Knanaya Pearl. Deepika Book House. ASIN B076GCH274.
- Mundadan, Anthony Mathias; Thekkedath, Joseph (1982). History of Christianity in India. Vol. 2. Bangalore: Church History Association of India.
- Podipara, Placid (1971). The Varthamanappusthakam. Pontifical Oriental Institute. ISBN 978-81-2645-152-4.
- Trivedi, S.D. (2010). Glorious Heritage of India: Research Papers on History, Art, and Epigraphy. Agam Kala Prakashan. ISBN 9788173200953.
- Vellian, Jacob (1986). Symposium on Knanites. Syrian Church Series. Vol. 12. Jyothi Book House.
- Vellian, Jacob (1990). Crown, Veil, Cross: Marriage Rights. Syrian Church Series. Vol. 15. Anita Printers. OCLC 311292786.
