= Puthencavu =

- village
- Location in Kerala, India Puthencavu (India)
- Coordinates: 9°19′23″N 76°38′23″E
- Country: India
- State: Kerala
- District: Alappuzha

Government
  - Body: Chengannur Municipality

Languages
  - Official: Malayalam, English
- Time zone: UTC+5:30 (IST)
- PIN: 689123
- Lok Sabha constituency: Mavelikkara
- Legislative Assembly constituency: Chengannur

Puthencavu is a village in Alappuzha District of Kerala, India, located 2 km east of Chengannur along the southern bank of the river Pamba. The village is around 2 km from Arattupuzha, and can be easily accessed from Chengannur and Arattupuzha.

== Education ==
Metropolitan Higher Secondary School, run by the Catholicate and MD Schools Corporate Management of the Malakara Orthodox Syrian Church is located at Puthencavu.

== Transportation ==
Chengannur Railway Station is the nearest railhead, and Trivandrum International Airport the nearest airport. The Century Multispeciality Hospital is located very near to Puthencavu Junction.

== Structures ==
The 218-year-old Puthencavu St Mary's Orthodox Church is located in the village. The remains of three leaders of the Malankara Sabha, Mar Thoma VI, Mar Thoma VIII & Geevarghese Mar Philoxenos are interred in the church.

== Notable people ==
Rev. George Mathan who is also known as Mallappallil Achan is from Puthencavu Kizhakethalaykal family. He wrote the first Malayalam Grammar 'Malayazhmayute vyakaranam.'1863, though Herman Gundert's grammar is considered first printed.He was the first Indian priest of Anglican Church.He is also considered as father of Malayalam prose by many scholars. Geevarghese Mar Philaxenos is another notable Metropolitan of the Orthodox Syrian Church belonging to Puthencavu. Dr. Abraham Ayrukuzhi, a well known scientist and former Dean of Kerala University. Barister K.K.Chacko, who was a judge Travancore High court and later Kerala High court. K.G. Kurien of Kunnumpurathu family was a biblical scholar and a leader of Brotheren Church. Mahakavi Puthencavu Mathan Tharakan hails from this village and has made significant contributions to the freedom movement and the Malayalam language. His son K. M. Tharakan was a president of the Kerala Sahitya Akademi, and a noted writer, novelist and critic.
