= Muloor S. Padmanabha Panicker =

Poet

Mooloor S. Padmanabha Panicker
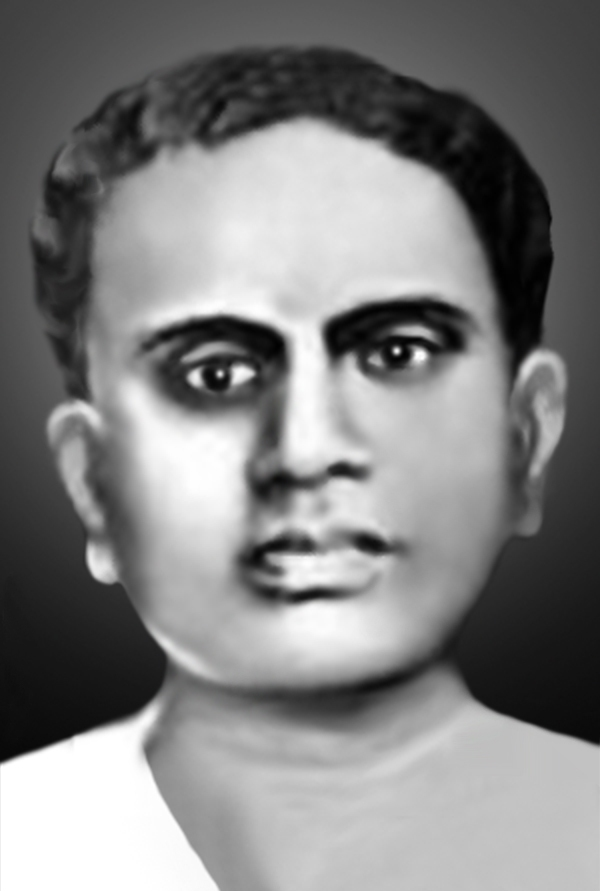
- Born: 1869; Travancore
- Died: 1931 (aged 61–62)
- Occupations: Poet, Activist, Historian
- Relatives: Muloor Sankaran Vaidyar(father); Veluthakunju Amma (mother)
- Writing career
- Notable works: Nalacharitham; Krishnarjuna Vijayam; Kiratham; Asannamarana Chintha Sathakom

Mooloor S. Padmanābha Panicker (a.k.a. Mooloor Asān or Sarasa Kavi, meaning "humour poet") (1869–1931) was a poet and a prominent social reform activist from the Travancore region of present-day Kerala.

== Early years ==
Padmanābhan was born in his mother's ancestral home named Kaavil near Panayannaarkavu, close to the town of Mannar in Central Travancore in 1869 (Malayalam year Kumbhom 27, 1044). His father was Mooloor Sankaran Vaidyar and mother was Veluthakunj Amma. Both his parents were from well educated, prosperous and respected Ezhava families. Kaavil was a family of traditional ayurvedic physicians, and the Mooloor family was well known for its Kalari (martial art), natural treatments, Sanskrit, philosophy, and spirituality. Mooloor's poetic masterpiece, Kirathom, was what brought him accolades from different quarters in his teens. His literary masterpiece, Kavi-Ramayanam, which he wrote at the age of 25, is deemed to be the motivational force behind the 1936 Temple Entry Proclamation, which abolished the ban on backward caste people entering Hindu temples in the state of Travancore.

== Early poetic days and major works ==
Padmanābhan initially studied Sanskrit, Ayurveda, kalari etc. from his father Muloor Sankaran Vaidyar. He started writing poems right from his childhood. He is a man of letters who dedicated his life not only for the literary work but also for his community (Ezhava) and the state (Kerala) as a whole. He was a member in the Sree Moolam Praja Sabha from 1914 onwards. He was an excellent orator as well. His major works include: "Nalacharitham", "Krishnarjuna Vijayam", "Kiratham" ("Ammanappattukal"), "Asannamarana Chintha Sathakom" (a poem that won a Bhashaposhini award), "Krishanrjuna Vijayam", "Kuchelavrutham" (Katha Kali literature), "Kokila Sandesam", "Avasarokthimala", "Theendal Gadha", "Moonnu Tharattukal", "Kavithaniroopanam", "Balabodhanam", "Neethisara Samuchyam", "Pooppadappattu", "Kalahamsam" (poems), "Sanmarga Chandrika", "Dharmapadam" (translations), and "Subhadraharanam" (drama).

== Mezhuveli Anandabhootheshawaram Temple ==
Mezhuveli Anandabhootheshawara Temple is situated at the heart of Mezhuveli. This temple was built by Mooloor S. Padmanābha Panicker. The prathishta and pooja was performed by Sree Narayana Guru. This century-old temple was built on a place called ‘Tholekavu’, which was surrounded by a small hill called ‘Meenchirakkal Hill’ on the southern side, ‘Ambottimodi’ (also called ‘Kailasam’) on the east, a beautiful stream flowing on the western side near 'Pottanmala’ and on the north side ‘Padmanabhan Kunnu’, a small hill. Tholekavu was a small forest, which is believed to be a part of the Pandalam Kingdom.

== Career ==
He was the first editor of the Kerala Kaumudi daily and founder of the 78-year-old Padmanabhodayam English School in the small hamlet of Mezhuveli. The late Kerala Varma Valiyakoyi Thampuran conferred the Sarasakavi title on Mooloor in 1913. The Government of Travancore nominated him as a member of the Sree Moolam Praja Sabha, the precursor of today's Legislative Assembly. Mooloor was elected vice-president of the Sree Narayana Dharma Paripalana (SNDP) Yogam in the 25th year of its formation. He died on 1931 (Malayalam Year 1106, Meenam 9).

== Educational institutions established by Mooloor ==
Following are the main educational institutions founded by the poet:

- Mezhuveli Padmanabhodayam Higher Secondary School
- Gangadhara Vydyasala, Mezhuveli
- Keralavarma Vilasom, Lower Primary School, Karakkad

Eight lower primary schools in the following places:

- Thalachira
- Valiyakulam
- Kanjeetlukara
- Thulikulam
- Kumbazha
- Chiramel

Elavumthitta Public Market, which now has several shopping complexes, was a great contribution of this poet, during his period as a Praja Saba member. 'Sree Moola Rajagopala Vilasam' Market he named, now recollects the rule of the Maharajas and Diwans of Travancore.

== Mooloor Smarakom (Mooloor Memorial) ==
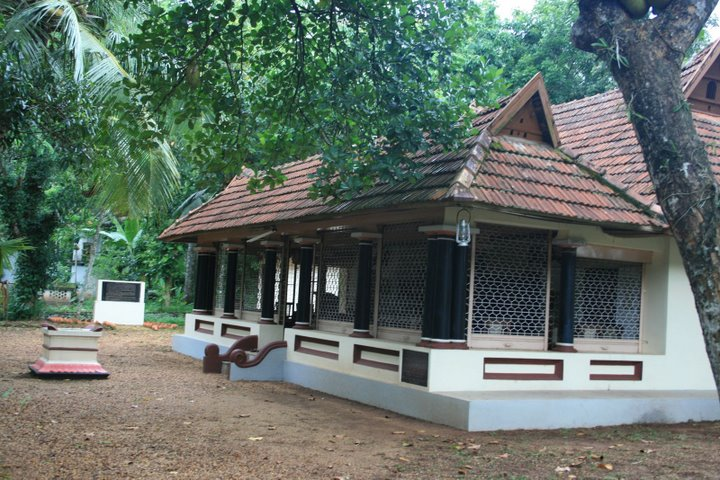
Muloor's home is preserved as a monument.

Mooloor named his residence Kerala Varma Soudham as a mark of respect for Kerala Varma Valiyakoyi Thampuran, who was his close friend. It was later converted into the Sarasakavi Mooloor Memorial by the State Government in 1989. His home in Elavumthitta is preserved as a monument by the Department of Culture, government of Kerala. The objective of the Mooloor Memorial is to familiarise the present generation with the rich social as well as literary contributions of the poet and to keep his memory alive. This is now famous for "Ezhuthiniruthu" (The starting of writing and reading of children).

== See also ==
- Kerala Varma Valiyakoyi Thampuran
- Bhashaposhini - a Malayala Manorama publication
- Panicker
- Elavumthitta
