= Puthencavu Mathan Tharakan =

Mathan Tharakan
- Born: 5 September 1903; Puthencavu, Chengannur, Travancore, British India
- Died: 5 April 1993 (aged 89)
- Occupations: Poet, Writer, Lyricist
- Spouse: Mariamma

Mahakavi Puthencavu Mathan Tharakan (born 1903) was a Malayalam poet.

== Birth and family ==
He was born on 5 September 1903 at Puthencavu, a village in present day Alapuzha district of Kerala, South India, then in Travancore to Mariamma and K. E. Mathai son of Eapen of the Kizhakkethalakal house .

He had 2 sons. His son K. M. Tharakan was a chairman of the Kerala Sahitya Akademi, noted critic, writer and novelist.

Surviving descendants of Mathan Tharakan, his great grand nephew C. John Mathai and family, currently reside in Alleppey.

== Education and career ==
His early life was spent in Puthencavu. He was inspired by the work of his great-uncle George Mathan to pursue a career in literature together with academic work.

By his own efforts, he was able to pass the Malayalam Vidwan exam and also earned a Master of Arts Degree in Malayalam in 1952, he joined Catholicate College, Pathanamthitta as a lecturer. He went on to become the Head of the Department of Malayalam and was the officiating Principal from 1957-1958. He was also a member of the Kerala Sahitya Akademi from 1960-1964. In 1972, he obtained permission from the government and made a successful attempt to revive "Bhajemathaam", the political newsweekly run by M. Mathunny from Cengannur in the twenties. As a young nationalist Mathan Tharakan was associated with the paper. A dedicated Congress man, he worked closely with Elanthoor Kumarji, the veteran Gandhian and Freedom Fighter, to promote Khadi and the nationalist ideology even after independence.

== Works ==
Mathan Tharakan earned the title of Mahakavi for his magnum opus on the life of Christ - Viswadeepam written in 1965. As a lyricist, he penned the lyrics for 14 songs which were used in the second Malayalam movie ever made, Gnanambika in 1940.
