= K. M. Tharakan =

Indian critic and novelist

Prof. Dr. K.M.Tharakan
- Born: 6 October 1930; Puthencavu, Chengannur, Travancore, British India
- Died: 15 July 2003 (aged 72); Thiruvalla, Kerala, India
- Education: Banaras Hindu University Mahatma Gandhi University
- Occupations: Writer, critic, novelist, professor, editor, orator
- Spouse: Rachel Tharakan

K. M. Tharakan (6 October 1930 – 15 July 2003) was a noted Indian critic, novelist, litterateur and educationalist from Kerala. He was the President of the Kerala Sahitya Akademi.

== Biography ==
=== Early life ===
K. M. Tharakan was born on 6 October 1930 at Puthencavu, the son of Mariamma and Mahakavi Puthencavu Mathan Tharakan of the Kizhakkethalakal family. He was married to Rachel Tharakan. He had two sons and two daughters.

In 1946, he completed his SSLC in English medium from the Chengannur English High School. He obtained his Master of Arts degree in Literature from the Banaras Hindu University. After his MA he continued with his studies in Religion & Culture at the Pittsburgh Theological Seminary.

=== Career ===
Tharakan worked as a lecturer at St. Albert's College from 1952 to 1959. From 1959 to 1979, he worked at Mar Athanasius College of Arts, Kothamangalam, retiring in 1980 as the department head. He was appointed as the editor of the Malayala Manorama Weekly in 1979 and also served as the editor of Bhashaposhini. In 1991 he was appointed as the President of the Kerala Sahitya Akademi. He authored over 50 books and various literary critiques and articles. He also translated many Malayalam works into English. He was awarded a Ph.D. from Mahatma Gandhi University in 1995 for his thesis, Theory of Synaesthesis in the Perspective of Rasa Sidantha.

Among other awards, he was awarded the Kerala Sahitya Akademi award in 1975 for his work Paschathya Sahitya Thatwasastram, a literary criticism.

=== Death ===
K. M. Tharakan died on 16 July 2003, at a private hospital in Tiruvalla after a prolonged illness. He was buried at St. Mary's Orthodox Cathedral in Puthencavu.

=== K. M. Tharakan Foundation ===
The K. M. Tharakan Foundation was set up in 1990 in his honour. The foundation awards the Aacharya Award, which carries a citation and a cash prize of US$100. The award is given to individuals who make significant contributions in the fields of society, culture and education. Winners of the Aacharya Award include Cyriac Thomas, D. Babu Paul and Fr. V. M. Varghese Kallooparambil.

== Selected works ==
=== Critiques ===
- Tarangini (1970)
- Pattu novalukal (1970)
- Atyadhinika sahityam (1971)
- Adhhunikha sahityadarshanam (1980)
- Nobel Sammanrhar (1981)
- Moral foundations of the Indian civilisation
- Western and Eastern Poetics: A Comparative Study of Reader Response in I. A. Richards and Abhinavagupta

=== Novels ===
- Avalannu bharya
- Ninakkayi mathram
- Ormakalude rathri
- Athmavil sugandham
- Ennil aliyunna dukham

=== Biographies ===
- M P Paul (1999)
- O Chanthumenon (1994)
- K C Mammen Mappilai – Portrait of KC Mammen Mappilai (1998)
- Kesava Dev – Thoolika padavaalakiya Kesava Dev (1986)
- Anugraheethanaya Basheer (1989)
