= Elavumthitta =

Elavumthitta Elavinthitta
- Town
- Interactive map of Elavumthitta
- Coordinates: 9°16′0″N 76°42′0″E
- Country: India
- State: Kerala
- District: Pathanamthitta

Government
  - Body: Mezhuveli Panchayath
- Elevation: 46 m (151 ft)

Population (2001)
  - Total: 32,399

Languages
  - Official: Malayalam, English
- Time zone: UTC+5:30 (IST)
- PIN: 689625
- Telephone code: 0468
- Vehicle registration: KL-03
- Nearest city: Kollam
- Literacy: 94.7%
- Lok Sabha: Pathanamthitta
- Assembly: Aranmula
- Civic agency: Mezhuveli Panchayath

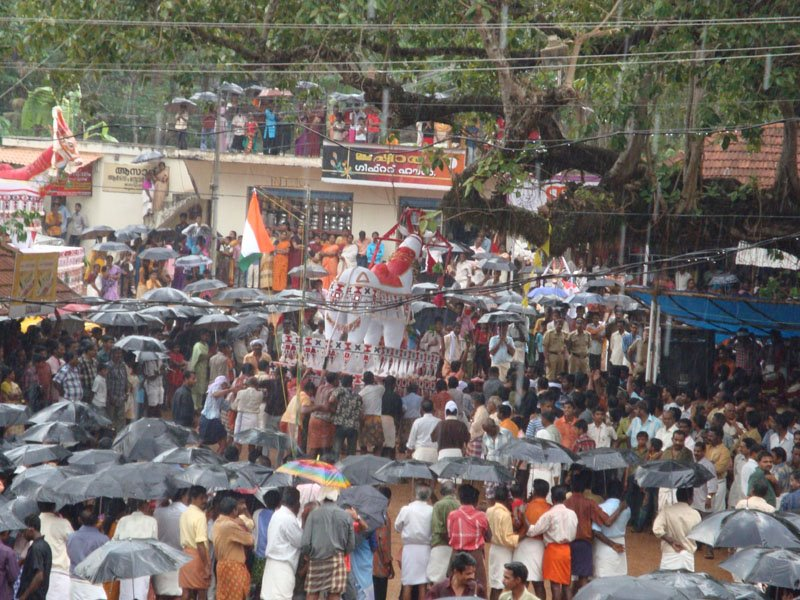
The villagers watching the festival

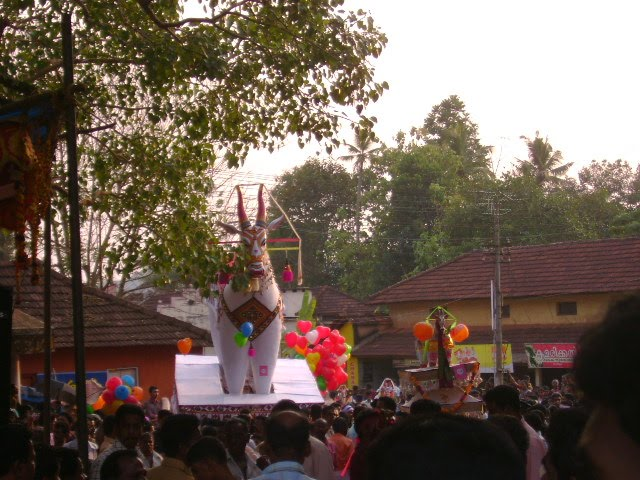
Ashwathy Festival

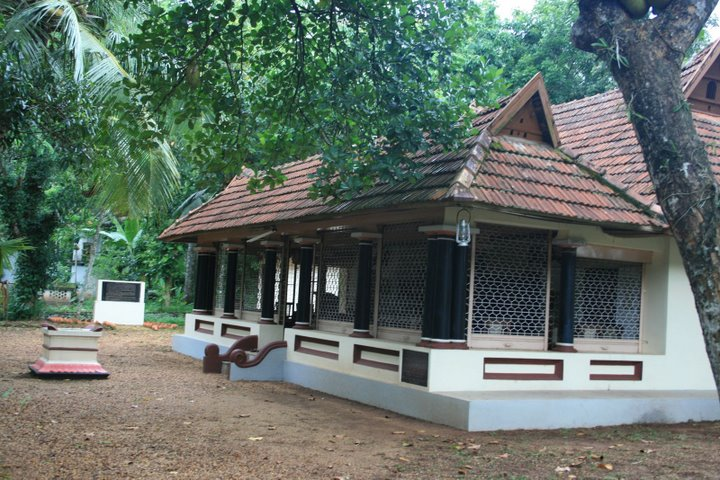
Mooloor Memorial

Elavumthitta (also Elavinthitta, Elavanthitta) is a town (located near to the border of Alappuzha and Pathanamthitta district) in Pathanamthitta district of Kerala, India. The majority of its inhabitants are from Hindu and Christian backgrounds. The primary crops are rubber, coconut, black pepper and plantain. The terrain is hilly with plenty of paddy fields in between. It is the commercial centre of Mezhuveli and Chenneerkara panchayaths.

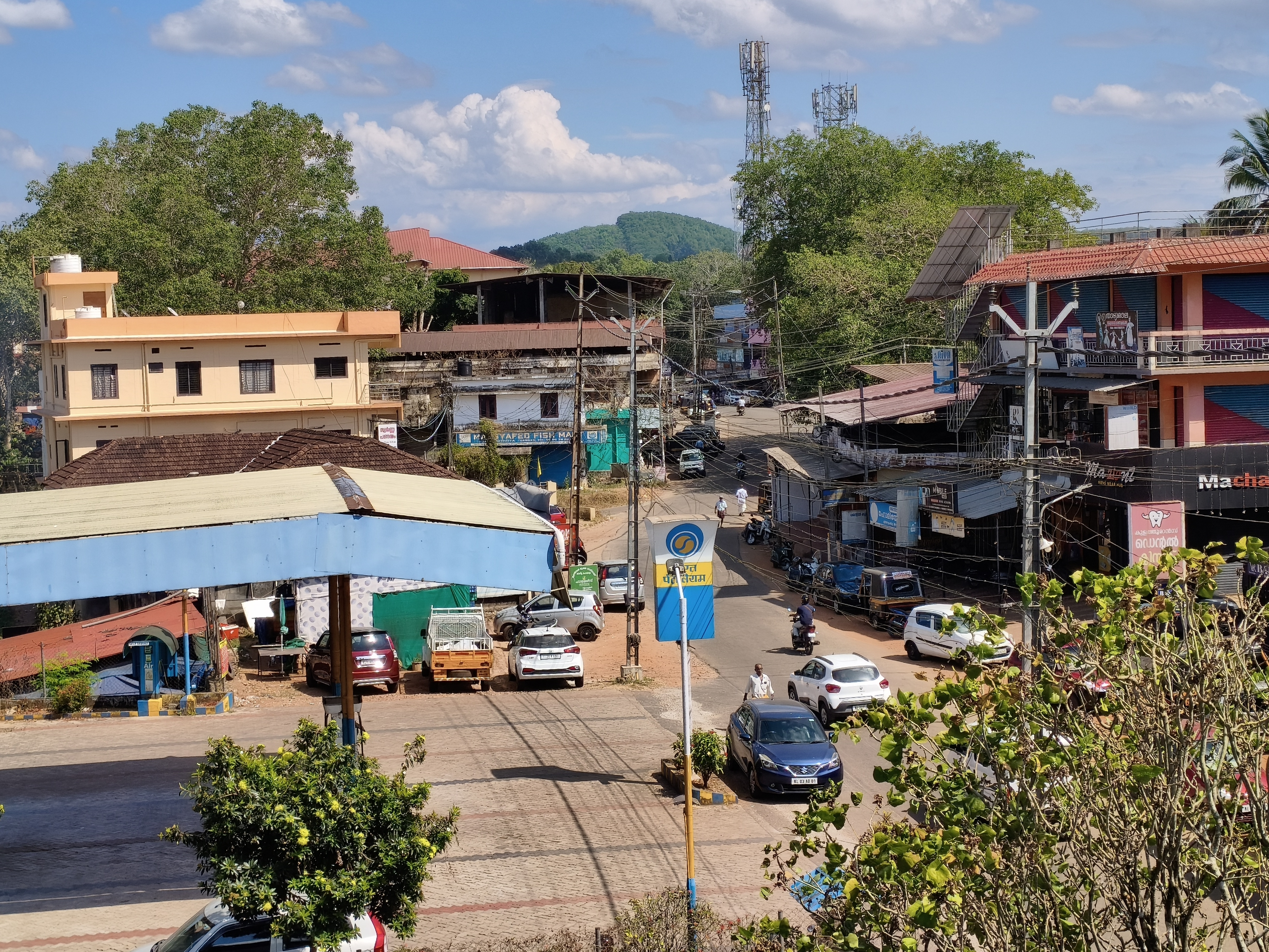
Elavumthitta Junction and Banyan Trees

== Geography and transportation ==
Elavumthitta is located in Pathanamthitta district of Kerala, India. The town is situated at an elevation of 46 metres (151 feet) above mean sea level, with paddy fields in the surrounding terrain at approximately 30 metres (100 feet).

Elavumthitta is nearly 12 km from the district headquarter Pathanamthitta. Other nearby Towns are, Chengannur (14.5 km), Pandalam (8 km), Kozhencherry (11 km) and Adoor (14 km).

- Nearest Railway Station = Chengannur Railway station (15 km)

[Other nearby Railway Stations: Cheriyanad Railway Station (19 km), Mavelikara railway Station (25 km), Thrivulla Railway Station (26 km), Kayamkulam junction (34 km).]

- Nearest Police Station = Elavumthitta Police station.
- Nearest Airport = Thiruvananthapuram International Airport (107 km), Nedumbassery International Airport (130 km)

Two main roads passes through Elavumthitta. One is Pathanamthitta – Elavumthitta – Chengannur. KSRTC is running chain service through this road. The other road is Adoor – Elavumthitta – Kozhencherry road.

The average height of Elavumthitta is 150 feet (46 m) above mean sea level. The low lying water shed paddy fields around Elavumthitta is 100 feet (30 m) above mean sea level. There is a peak called Namakuzhy, 387 feet (118 m) above mean sea level 2 km. north of Elavumthitta. This peak can be considered as the highest spot in the area. There is a legend about this peak that the pandavas in exile visited this place and stayed here for a short while. There were giant size foot marks imprinted on rocks scattered above the hill believed to be of Bhima the mighty bare hand warrior of Mahabharat epic. And also there was a pit on the rock with perennial source of water; signs reinforcing the local beliefs.

=== Rivers and water systems ===
Elavumthitta is situated within the catchment area of two major rivers: the Sacred Pampa and the Achankovil. The Pamba River basin extends over an area of 2,235 square kilometres (863 sq mi), bounded on the east by the Western Ghats and on the west by the Arabian Sea.

The Achankovil River, a 128-kilometre-long west-flowing river, originates in the Western Ghats at Pathanamthitta district at an elevation of 700 metres and joins the Pamba River at Veeyapuram. The abundant rainfall in the region sustains both rivers throughout the year and maintains the region's groundwater levels.

=== Economy ===
The primary crops in Elavumthitta include rubber, coconut, black pepper, and plantains. Rubber cultivation was introduced to Kerala by British planters in the late 19th century, with the first plantations established in the Western Ghats highlands of regions including Pathanamthitta. Rubber cultivation expanded rapidly during the early to mid-20th century through government initiatives and technological advancements, transforming the landscape of Kerala's highlands and becoming a major cash crop.

Dairy farming is a significant supplementary economic activity in Elavumthitta. Elavumthitta also hosts a unit of Akay Flavours and Aromatics Pvt. Ltd. at Nallanikunnu, Elavumthitta, a food and agro‑processing exporter of essential oils and oleoresins.

== Major townships around Elavumthitta ==
1. Geographic location.

- Northwest = Chengannur (14.5 km)
- North = Thiruvalla (23.9 km), Kozhenchery (11 km), Aranmula (10.5 km)
- Northeast = Ranni (20.5 km)
- West = Mavelikkara (25 km)
- Centre = Elavumthitta
- East = Pathanamthitta (12 km)
- Southwest = Pandalam (8 km)
- South = Adoor (14 km)
- Southeast = Omalloor (8 km)

2. Cites.

- Kottayam (50 km)
- Thiruvananthapuram (100 km)
- Kochi (111 km)
- Alapuzha (58 km)
- Kollam (58 km)

== Rainfall ==
Elavumthitta does not have its own rain gauge, but the area is in the close proximity of Pathanamthitta, which is 12 km. away and has a Rain gauge. The rain fall data for the past few years is given below in mm .

year	Jan	Feb	Mar	Apr	May	Jun	July	Aug	Sep	Oct	Nov	Dec
2005	20	1	77	358	279	652	670	155	421	220	375	91
2006	27.7	0	148.3	135.6	448.7	452	476	271.3	320.9	480.4	253.7	0
2007	0	10	24.5	313	156.8	632.8	755.2	325.6	444.1	456.2	176.5	8.1
2008	0	65.3	158	198.4	61.5	287	644.1	346.1	368.2	345.9	142.9	40.7
2009	5.5	2	49	115.4	166.8	378	454	227.4	290.2	222.7	299.6	34.9
2010	31	0.7	66.3	210	268.2	502.5	432.5	402.2	259.4	454.9	526.4	89.1
2011	46	74.3	92.5	269.7	175.5	591.2	305.7	286.2	334.2	165.7	132.8	176
2012	9.1	13	84.6	281.5	84.6	179.5	270.6	451.6	138.4	158.9	120.1	26
2013	9	24.4	92	47	154	728.7	608.4	281	310.3	268.4	306.1	18

Sources

1. Agricultural Statistics – (Website Panchayat level statistics-2011; Pathanamthitta District)
2. India Metrological Department

The average annual rainfall is calculated from the above data which comes to 2700 mm

== History and culture ==
Elavumthitta Market celebrated its centenary year in 2009. Muloor S. Padmanabha Panicker, a poet and social reformer and a disciple of Sree Narayana Guru, established the Elavumthitta market in 1909 when he was a member of the Sreemoolam Prajasabha. He named the market as "Sreemoolam Rajagopalavilasam". The Elavumthitta market celebrated its 100th anniversary in September 2009.

=== Aswathy festival ===
The Aswathy festival is the most significant annual celebration in Elavumthitta, held in the Malayalam month of Meenam. Unlike Onam, which is celebrated throughout Kerala, Aswathy is unique to Elavumthitta and draws local participation in various cultural and commercial activities.

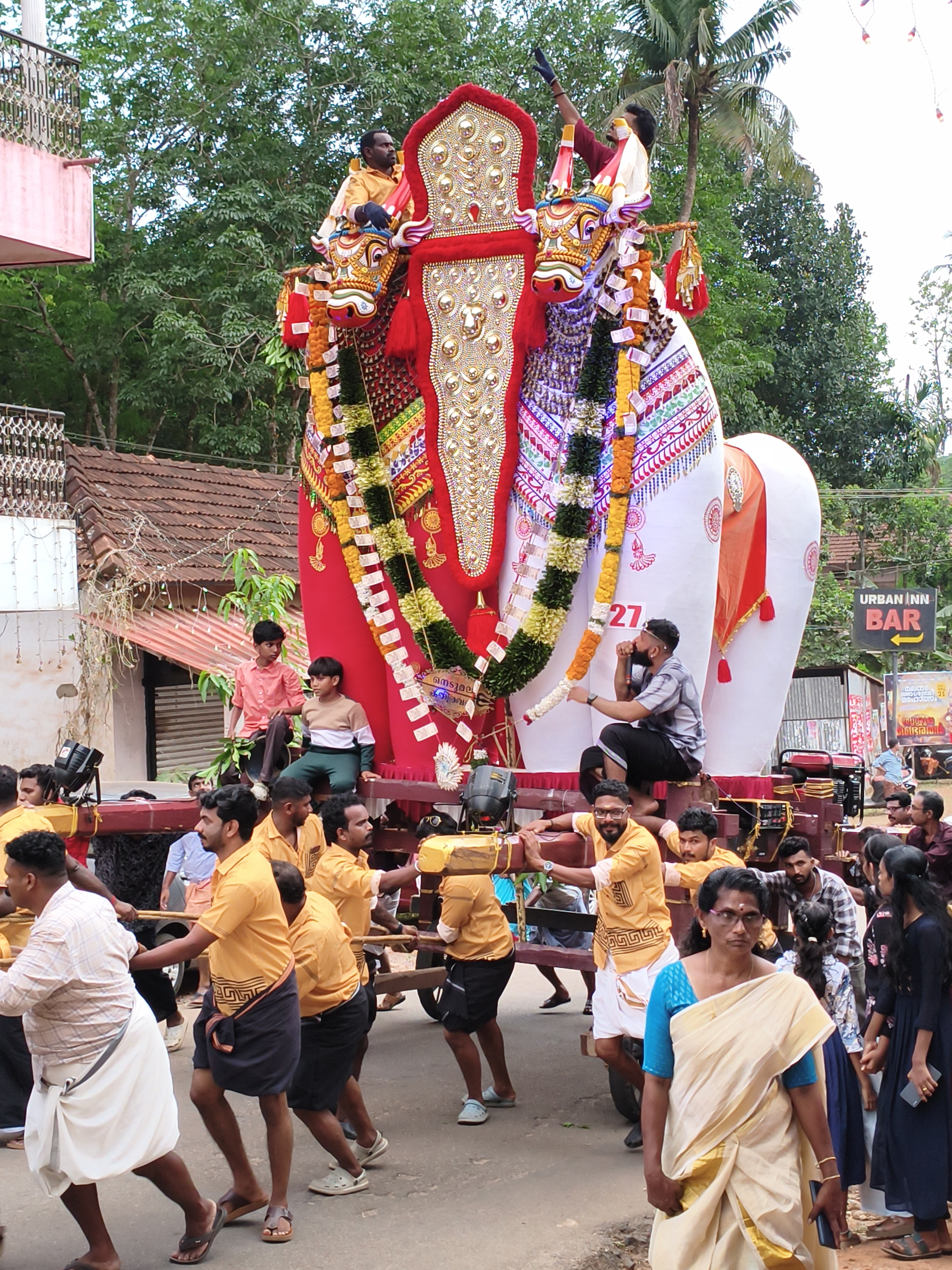
Elavumthitta Aswathy Kettukaazhcha

=== Cattle market ===
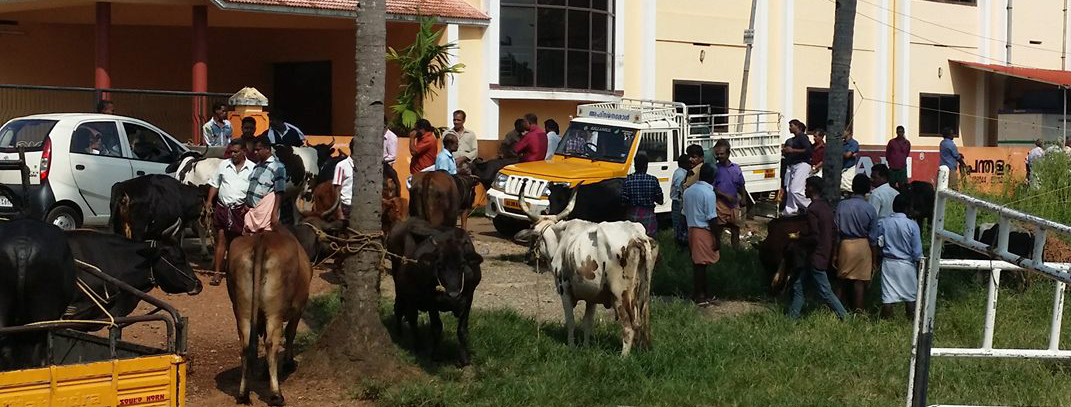
A busy day at Elavumthitta cattle market.

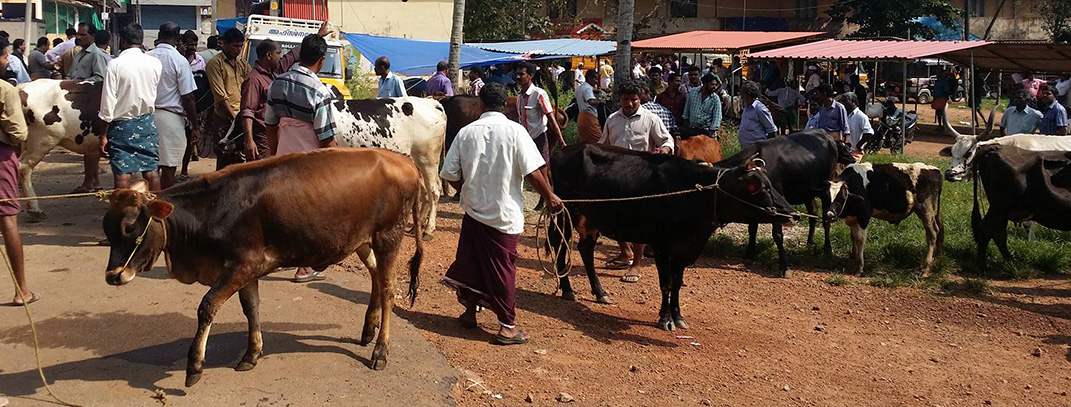
Cattle market is active on 9th and 22nd of every Malayalam month.

Elavumthitta market popularly known as Elavumthitta Chantha (ഇലവുംതിട്ട ചന്ത) celebrated its 100th year in September 2009. The cattle market is held on the 9th and 22nd of every Malayalam month.

== First Sivagiri Pilgrimage ==
The first Sivagiri pilgrimage began on 28 December 1932, from Elavumthitta with five pilgrims, marking the beginning of an annual tradition approved by Sri Narayana Guru in 1928. The Sivagiri pilgrimage was conceived by Guru's disciples including Vallabhasseri Govindan Vaidyar and T. K. Kittan (Kittan Writer). Malayalam reports note that the first pilgrimage from Elavumthitta in 1932 set out from the house of poet Muloor S. Padmanabha Panicker, under the leadership of his son Divakara Panicker.

The five young pilgrims who initiated the first journey were P.K. Divakara Panicker (son of Muloor S. Padmanabha Panicker), P.K. Kesavan, P.V. Raghavan, M.K. Raghavan, and S. Sankunni.

The team was led by Sri.P.K.Divakara Panicker. This was a historical journey that led to the famous Sivagiri pilgrimage conducted every year. The pilgrimage has become an occasion of unity and peace.

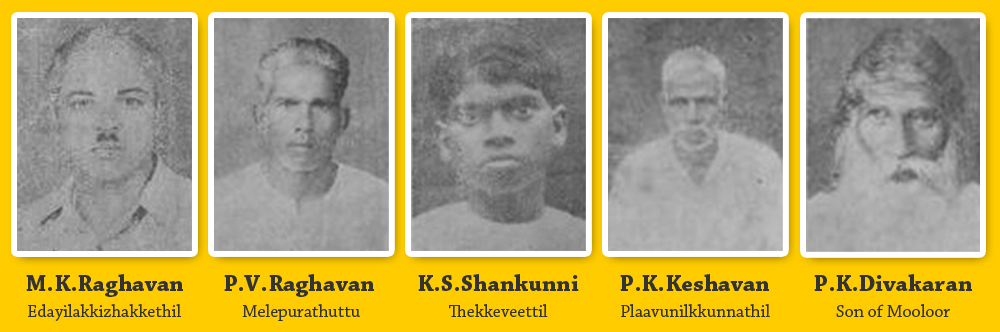

== Mooloor S. Padmanābha Panicker ==
Muloor S. Padmanabha Panicker (1869–1931) was a renowned poet and social reformer who made significant contributions to Elavumthitta's development through his literary work and advocacy for social reform. He named his residence in Elavumthitta as 'Kerala Varma Soudham' as a mark of respect towards Kerala Varma Valiyakoyi Thampuran who was his close friend. Muloor Smarakam, a memorial dedicated to Padmanabha Panicker built at the location of his residence, is located in Elavumthitta and serves as a cultural and historical landmark. The memorial includes a museum housing an extensive collection of manuscripts, personal belongings, and photographs that showcase his contributions to Malayalam literature and social justice movements.

== Libraries in and around Elavumthitta ==
- Dr. Ambedkar Memorial Aksharakala Samskarika Kendram Library
- Menon Smaraka Grandhasala, Nediyakala, Mezhuveli
- Janatha Library and Reading Room, Muttathukonam

== Educational institutions ==
- Sreebuddha College of Engineering (now mixed)
- Salvation Army L P school, Thumpamon North – This is the first School of Elavumthitta, established in the year 1903. It celebrated its Centenary year in 2003. The school is located 1 km away from Elavumthitta market on the way side of Ramanchira road.
- S N Giri S N D P H S S Chenneerkkara
- S N D P H S S, Muttathukonam North
- CMS high School, Kuzhikkala
- Sree Narayana Guru College of Advanced Studies, Mezhuveli
- Padmanabhodayam H S S, Mezhuveli
- Gangadhara Vilasam L P School, Mezhuveli
- Teachers Training Institute, Mezhuveli
- Govt. Model L P School, Mezhuveli North
- U P School, Mezhuveli North
- S N Govt. L P School, Kooduvettikkal, Karithotta
- Govt. Of India Women's I T I, Elavumthitta
- Sarasakavi Mooloor Smaraka U P School, Chandanakkunnu
- Ambedkar English Medium School, Konganal buildings, near Melathemukku.
- Mezhuveli Panchayat I T C
- CMS U P School, Nallanikunnu
- Kendriya Vidyalaya, Chenneerkara

== Temples and Churches in and around Elavumthitta ==
- Elavumthitta Bhagavathy Temple
- Elavumthitta Malanada
- Ayathil Malanada
- Mezhuveli Anandabhootheshawaram Temple
- Aranmula Sree Parthasarathi Temple
- Omalloor Raktha Kanda Swamy Temple
- Pandalam Valiya Koickal Sree Dharma Sastha Temple
- Kulakkada SivaParavathi Temple
- Christ The King Catholic Church Elavumthitta, Punalur Diocese. Established on 4 November 1936.
- Kuzhikkala Marthoma Church
- Manjinikkara Church
- Bethlehem Marthomma Church
- India Pentecostal Church of God
- The Pentecostal Mission
- St. Paul's CSI Church, Nallanikunnu
- Malankara Catholic Church
- Sehion Mar Thoma Church
- St Thomas Marthoma Church (Pulinthitta Church)
- Thabor Mar Thoma Church Pullamala
- Jarusalem Mar Thoma Church Ayathil
- Ebenezer Marthoma Church Chenneerkara
- Thachirethu Vettiyil Sree Nagaraja Nagayakshi kavu

== Writers / Litterateurs ==
- Mooloor S Padmanabha Panicker
- Kambisseri Karunakaran

== Demographics ==
Elavumthitta is flanked by the area of 4 panchayats. Following data is from the book 'Panchayat level Statistics 2006' published by Department of Economics & Statistics Thiruvananthapuram.

Panchayat	Households	Population	Literacy rate
Chenneerkkara	4834	19538	94.27
Mezhuveli	3734	15223	95.62
Kulanada	6051	24493	93.58
Elanthoor	3809	15425	95.33

Elavumthitta is spread in four Panchayats namely Mezhuveli, Chenneerkkara, Kulanada and Elanthoor. The total households in Elavumthitta is 7,988 and population is 32,399. The literacy of Elavumthitta area is 94.70%.

Dairy farming is common here.

== See also ==
- Mooloor S.Padmanabha Panicker
- Abin Varkey MLA, Aranmula
- Veena George (Ex MLA, Aranmula)
- Adv.V.K Varghese (Ex. MLA, pathanamthitta)
- K. C. Rajagopalan (EX. MLA, Aranmula)
- P. N. Chandrasenan (Ex. MLA, Aranmula)
- Kambisseri Karunakaran (Chief Editor Janayugam)
- Prof. Sasikumar (Chairman Sree Buddha Group of Institutions)
- S.N. Vijayan (former National Vice President Ezhava Mahajana Sabha)
- Chengannur
- Pandalam
- Alapuzha district
- Chengannur Railway
- Madambi, a 2008 Malayalam film which was shot here
