= Chethallur =

- village
- Location in Kerala, India Chethallur (India)
- Coordinates: 10°55′0″N 76°18′0″E
- Country: India
- State: Kerala
- District: Palakkad

Area
  - Total: 7 km^{2} (2.7 sq mi)

Languages
  - Official: Malayalam, English
- Time zone: UTC+5:30 (IST)
- PIN: 678583
- Vehicle registration: KL-

Chethallur is a village located in the Palakkad District of Kerala, India. The population of the village is around 5,000 people. The village gained media attention with the construction of the Muriyamkanni Bridge, which may reduce the driving distance between Kozhikode and Palakkad by around 10 km or 6.21 miles.

== Temples and festivals ==
Sri Panamkurussikavu is a Bhagavathi Temple located in Chethallur. Panamkurussikavu Pooram is a festival that takes place in Chethallur. Each year, more than forty elephants participate in "Ezhunnallippu" on the final day of Pooram. The Pooram festival is celebrated in March or April.

Calicut International Airport is the nearest airport (100 km or 62.1 miles) while Angadippuram is the nearest railway station (20 km or 12.4 miles).

The folklore character, Naranath Bhranthan (also known as The madman of Naranamis) claimed to have been born in Chethallur. As he grew up, the young boy picked up a strange hobby - rolling huge boulders up the hill near his home.
