= Sreekrishnapuram, Palakkad =

Sreekrishnapuram
- Town
- Interactive map of Sreekrishnapuram
- Coordinates: 10.91220°N 76.41129°E
- Country: India
- State: Kerala
- District: Palakkad

Government
  - Body: Sreekrishnapuram Grama Panchayath

Population
  - Total: Almost 25,000

Languages
  - Official: Malayalam, English
  - Spoken: Malayalam
- Time zone: UTC+5:30 (IST)
- PIN: 679513
- Vehicle registration: KL-51

Sreekrishnapuram is a town within the Ottappalam Tehsil of Palakkad district in the state of Kerala, India.

== Demographics ==
- Total population: Almost 25,000

== Education ==
The town has a government Engineering College established in 1999 and several schools:

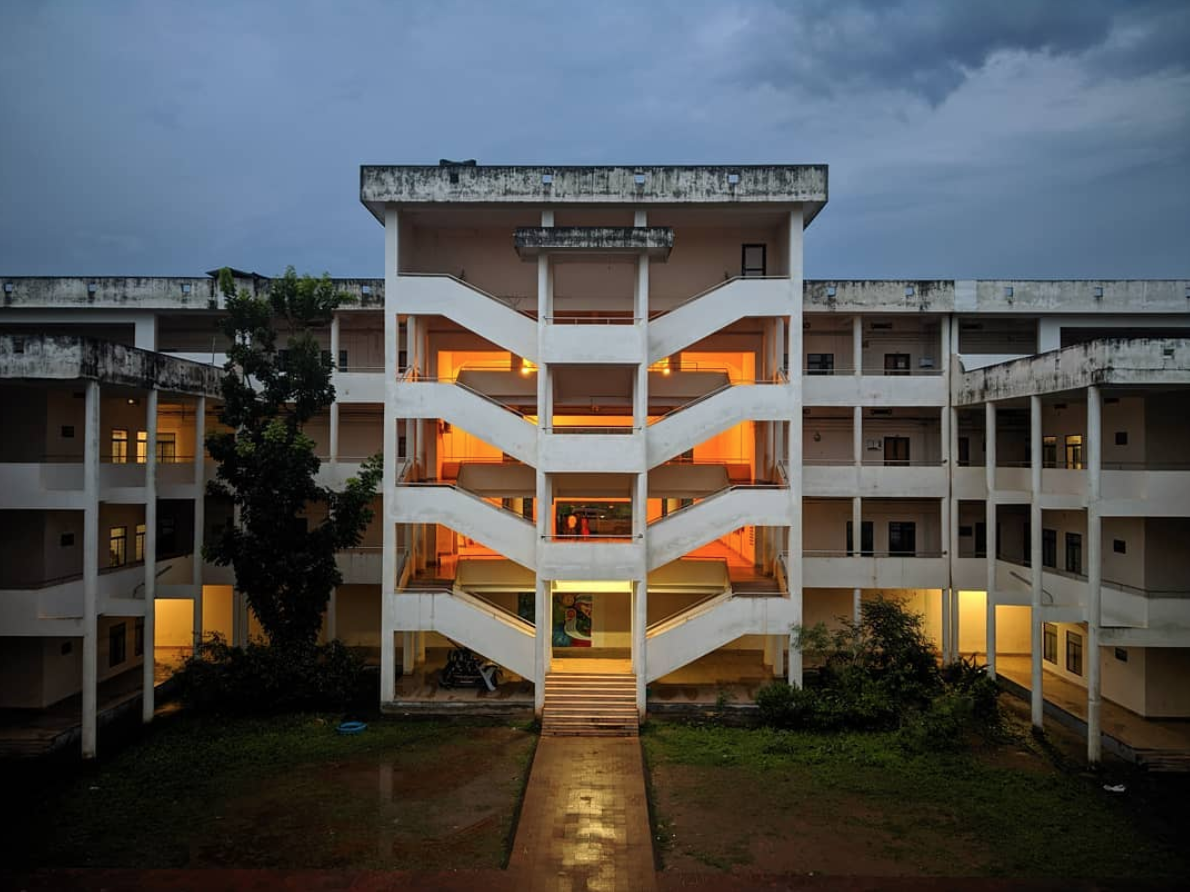
Government Engineering College Palakkad (Sreekrishnapuram)

- HSS Sreekrishnapuram
- St. Dominic's Convent English Medium School
- AUPS Sreekrishnapuram

== Places of interest ==
- Lt. Col. Niranjan Memorial I.T.I., Elambulassery
- Om Sharavanabhava Matham (Math)
