= Unnikrishnan Thiruvazhiyode =

Indian civil servant and novelist

Unnikrishnan Thiruvazhiyode (born 1942) is an Indian civil servant and a Malayalam language novelist from the state of Kerala. He received the Kerala Sahitya Akademi Award in 1992 for the novel Driksakshi.

== Education and career ==
Unnikrishnan earned Bachelor of Science in Physics from Government Victoria College, Palakkad and then earned a Bachelor of Education degree from Feroke Training College. He later went on to earn Advanced Financial Management from Strathclyde University, Scotland and in Public Sector Management from Leeds University, United Kingdom.

He commenced his career as a teacher in 1963. He later joined the Central Secretariat Service in 1966 and retired in year 2002 as Deputy Secretary to Government of India from Ministry of Heavy Industries and Public Enterprises.

== Life ==
He was born in Thiruvazhiyode village in Palakkad district of Kerala, in 1942. He is married to Sridevi and has three children, Amrita, Namrata and Abhilash. The writer resides in New Delhi.

== Works ==
Stories

- Ha Paris
- Thiruvazhiydinte Kathakal

Novels

- Hippy
- Oru Dhwani Aayiram Prathidhwani
- Maranathinte Niram
- Nakhakshathangal
- Panam
- Driksakshi
- Choothattam
- Neelamalakalile Suvarna Nnjhorikal
- Layanam
- Manassakshi

Novelettes

- Velichhathinte Porulukal
- Nakhachitrangal
- Sisiranidra

Other works

- Theekkudukka (Drama)
- Thaalam Thavalam (Radio play)
- Aahuthi (Radio play)
