= Mezhuveli =

Mezhuveli Tholayil
- town
- Location in Kerala, India Mezhuveli (India)
- Coordinates: 9°17′10″N 76°41′20″E
- Country: India
- State: Kerala
- District: Pathanamthitta

Languages
  - Official: Malayalam, English
- Time zone: UTC+5:30 (IST)
- PIN: 689507
- Vehicle registration: KL-

Mezhuveli is a village in Kerala, India, situated between the holy rivers of Pamba and Achankovil. It is located 16 kilometers south-west of Pathanamthitta and 12 kilometers east of Chengannur. The Ananda Bhoodeswaram temple in Mezhuveli is dedicated to the Lord Siva.It is famous for the Kettukazhicha during the Utsavam (temple festival) which starts on the Maha Sivarathri every year, linked to the Malayalam calendar. During kettukazhcha, the devotees bring different kinds of idol to the temple. Mezhuveli is also famous for the PHSS, with a heritage of more than 80 years. Half a kilometer south-west of Mezhuveli is Pottan Mala, which was named in respect to the Appooppan, who once lived there. The Pottan mala Appoppan Devasthanam temple in dedication to the Appoppan is situated at the top. Everyday people worship inside and outside by lighting candles and lamps. Also the famous Rolls Automotives and Hi-Tech Innovations are from Mezhuveli.

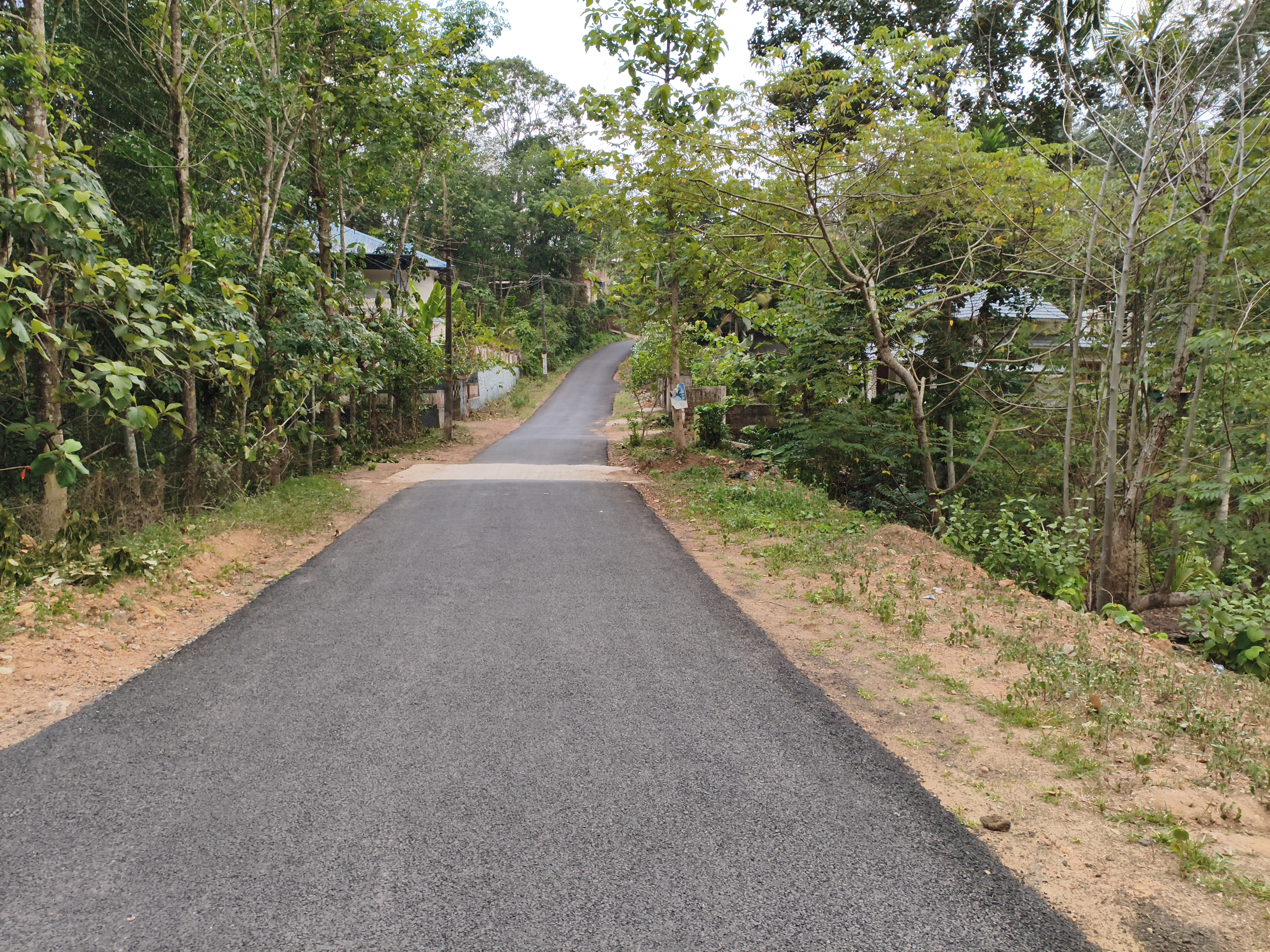
Ward 12 Anarkod/Mullanvathukkal of Mezhuveli Grama Panchayat

== Nearby towns ==
- Pandalam
- Kulanada
- Pathanamthitta
- Kozhencherry
- Aranmula
- Kidangannur
- Elavumthitta
- Chengannur
- Thiruvalla

== Languages ==
- Malayalam
- English
