= Bridges (surname) =

Bridges is a surname. Notable people with the surname include:

- Alan Bridges (1927–2013), English film and television director
- Alexander Bridges, English footballer
- Angelica Bridges (born 1970), American actress, model and singer
- Barry Bridges (born 1941), English footballer
- Beau Bridges (born 1941), American actor
- Bill Bridges (basketball) (1939–2015), American basketball player
- Bles Bridges (1947–2000), South African singer
- Calvin Bridges (1889–1938), American geneticist
- Charles Bridges (disambiguation), multiple people
- Cheryl Bridges (born 1941), American long-distance runner
- Ludacris (born Christopher Brian Bridges in 1977) American rapper and actor
- Curley Bridges (1934–2014), American blues, rock and roll, and R&B musician
- Daniel Bridges (died 1984), American murder victim
- Ebanie Bridges (born 1986), Australian professional boxer
- Edward Bridges, 1st Baron Bridges (1892–1969), British civil servant and Cabinet Secretary
- Elisa Bridges (1973–2002), American model and actress
- Emory E. Bridges (1905–1997), American politician
- Frank Bridges (1890–1970), American college sports coach
- Frank M. Bridges (1834–1885), American politician
- Garey Bridges (born 1969), British actor
- George Bridges (disambiguation), multiple people
- George Washington Bridges (1825–1873), American politician
- George Wilson Bridges (1788–1863), writer, photographer and Anglican cleric
- Harry Bridges (1901–1990), American labor leader
- Hedley Francis Gregory Bridges (1902–1947), Canadian politician
- Henry Bridges (disambiguation), multiple people
- Jalen Bridges (born 2001), American basketball player
- James Bridges (1936–1993), American screenwriter, film director, producer, and actor
- Jeff Bridges (born 1949), American actor
- J'Nai Bridges, American operatic mezzo-soprano
- John Bridges (disambiguation), multiple people
- Jordan Bridges (born 1973), American actor
- Kevin Bridges (born 1986), Scottish comedian
- Lloyd Bridges (1913–1998), American actor
- Leon Bridges (born 1989), American singer and songwriter
- Lucas Bridges (1874–1949), Anglo-Argentine author and explorer
- Marilyn Bridges (born 1948), American photographer
- Mark Bridges (disambiguation), multiple people
- Michael Bridges (born 1978), English footballer
- Michelle Bridges (born 1970), Australian personal trainer, author & TV personality
- Miles Bridges (born 1998), American basketball player
- Mikal Bridges (born 1996), American basketball player
- Randy Bridges, American politician
- Robert Bridges (1844–1930), English Poet Laureate
- Robert Bridges (critic) (1858–1941), American editor and author
- Rocky Bridges (1927–2015), American baseball player
- Roy D. Bridges Jr. (born 1943), American astronaut
- Ruby Bridges (born 1954), American activist
- Rutt Bridges, American geophysicist and politician
- Sheila Bridges, American interior designer
- Simon Bridges (born 1976), New Zealand politician
- Steve Bridges (1963–2012), American comedian, impressionist and actor
- Styles Bridges (1898–1961), American politician
- Thomas Bridges (disambiguation), multiple people
- Todd Bridges (born 1965), American actor
- Trikweze Bridges (born 2000), American football player
- William Bridges (disambiguation), multiple people

Given name unknown

- Bridges (cricketer, born 1790s), English cricketer with Cambridge Town Club
- Bridges (cricketer, born 1780s), English cricketer with Homerton Cricket Club

== See also ==
- Bridge (surname)
- Brydges
