= Saint Thomas Anglicans =

St. Thomas Christians within the Church of South India

Total population
- 200,000

Regions with significant populations
- Kerala, India; with immigrant congregations in Europe, North America and Australia

Languages
- Malayalam, English

Religion
- Anglicanism (1836–1947); United Protestant within the Anglican Communion (1947 onwards)

Related ethnic groups
- Malayalis, Cochin Jews

Saint Thomas Anglicans (often called Anglican Syrian Christians or CSI Syrian Christians) are the Saint Thomas Christian members of the Church of South India (CSI); the self-governing South Indian province of the Anglican Communion. They are among the several different ecclesiastical communities that splintered out of the once undivided Saint Thomas Christians; an ancient Christian community whose origins goes back to the first century missionary activities of Saint Thomas the Apostle, in the present-day South Indian state of Kerala. The Apostle, as legend has it, arrived in Malankara (derived from Maliankara near Muziris) in AD 52.

The community began as a faction of Malankara Syrian Christians, who opted to join the Anglican Church, mostly between 1836 and 1840. This happened due to the influence of the Church Mission Society missionaries, who laboured amongst the Oriental Orthodox Christians of Travancore. In 1879, these St. Thomas Anglican congregations were organized as the Diocese of Travancore and Cochin of the Church of England. Other Saint Thomas Christians influenced by Anglican practice and belief would go on to found the Malankara Mar Thoma Syrian Church, a church in full communion with the Anglican Communion.

In 1930, a separate Anglican ecclesiastical province was founded from the Church of England dioceses in the British Indian Empire, establishing the Church of India, Burma and Ceylon. In 1947, soon after Indian independence, the Anglican dioceses of South India, merged with other Protestant Churches in the region, on the basis of the Lambeth Quadrilateral, forming the Church of South India. Anglican Syrian Christians have been members of the CSI, ever since.

== The Beginning ==
In November 1795, a treaty of perpetual friendship and tributary alliance was signed between the Raja of Travancore and the East India Company. The treaty was again modified in 1805, which established British paramountcy over Travancore. The British bureaucracy of colonial India was made up of many Evangelical Christians, who were surprised by the presence of an autochthonous Christian community. They believed that the indigenous Church, if properly equipped, could be used to reach and Christianize the Indian peoples. The British mindset was also shaped by the political ramifications of such an approach.

=== Early contacts ===
The beginning of the relationship between the Anglican Church and the Malankara Church could be traced to the visits of Rev. R. H. Kerr and Rev. Claudius Buchanan to the Malabar Syrians in 1806, during the episcopate of Mar Dionysius I. These were facilitated by Gen. Colin Macaulay, the first British Resident of Travancore. The missionaries found the Malabar Syrian Christians in poor and depressed conditions. This is clear in the words of the Syrian Metropolitan, in his interview with Claudius Buchanan, recorded in Dr. Buchanan's famous book "Christian Researches in Asia"; in which Mar Dionysius I says, "you have come to visit a declining church".

=== Establishment of a Seminary and Anglican Mission of Help for the Syrians ===
In 1810, Colonel John Munro, a man with deep Christian convictions became the Resident of Travancore, an office he held for the next 10 years. Col Munro persuaded Rani Gowri Lakshmi Bayi of Travancore, with whom he was on very good terms to donate land in Kottayam as well as the money and timber, in-order to build the Orthodox Pazhaya Seminary (founded 1815) for the Malankara Church. He also petitioned the Church Missionary Society to send missionaries on a Help Mission, to educate and train the clergy of the Malankara Church.

In the coming years, several pious Christian men like Benjamin Bailey, Joseph Fenn and Henry Baker (Sr) arrived in Kottayam and worked at the Pazhaya Seminary and among the Malankara Syrians. The missionaries took charge of the college as its early Principals, taught Biblical languages and worked on the translation of the Holy Bible to the native language Malayalam.

=== Reform assembly of Mavelikkara ===
The CMS missionaries reckoned that a real improvement in the life and conditions of Malankara Syrians, could be achieved only by reforming their Church. They used their position in the Kottayam seminary propagate their ideas and shared them with Metropolitan Mar Dionysius III. To explore the feasibility of reforms, the Metropolitan convened an assembly of his prominent clergy and laity with the missionaries on 3 December 1818, at Mavelikkara. A committee of distinguished priests was appointed to identify areas of improvement. However, Metropolitan Mar Dionysius IV, who took office in 1825, was antagonistic towards these efforts.

The earliest British missionaries shared warm cordial ties with the successive Malankara Metropolitans of their time and were sensitive to their apprehensions and bearing. The Metropolitans too, were deeply appreciative of the much needed help and support provided by the missionaries and British Residents, to their Church. This is evident from the words of Mar Dionysius III, in his letter to the President of the CMS Lord Gambier, in which the Metropolitan likens Resident Colin Macaulay to Moses, Rev. Claudius Buchanan to Aaron, Resident John Munro to Joshua and expresses heartfelt gratitude to the missionaries, for their services to his Church.

=== Dissolution of partnership between the Malankara Church and CMS ===
The cordial relations between the missionaries and the Malankara Syrians did not last very long. The younger missionaries who arrived later were uncompromising evangelists who insisted on major reforms to faith and doctrines of the Malankara Church, which the changed Jacobite leadership didn't want. Moreover, the British administration did intervene in the affairs of the Syrian Church, including the appointment of its Metropolitans. The Syrians, who bore the scars of the Portuguese Inquisition, felt that the excessive interest shown by the British in their Church, was indicative of an impending hostile take over.

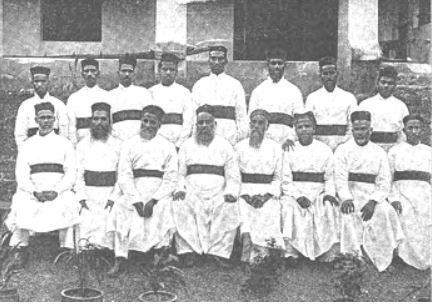
Original Syrian–Anglican cattanars from the nineteenth century

The discord and misgivings eventually led to the 1836 Synod of Mavelikkara, in which the Malankara Syrian Community under Mar Dionysius IV, decided to keep all their age-old traditional practices and be subject to the authority of the Syriac Orthodox Patriarch of Antioch. Inevitably, the missionaries and the Jacobites parted ways. However, two decades of their close cooperation, left a profound and lasting impact on the Malankara Syrian community. Members of the Reform Exploratory Committee of 1818, under the leadership of Abraham Malpan, initiated a reformation of the Malankara Church, from 1836.

=== Birth of the Syrian–Anglican community ===
In 1836, as soon as the missionaries separated from the Malankara Syrian Church, a fraction of its members who were in favour of the reformed ideologies of the missionaries, sought admission into the Anglican Church, and were received. This Anglican Syrian community was initially concentrated in the regions of Kottayam, Thiruvalla, Mallapally and Mavelikkara, where the missionaries had earlier worked with the Jacobites.

St. Thomas Anglicans were the first Reformed group to emerge from the St. Thomas Christian community. They were also the first Saint Thomas Christians to worship and celebrate the Eucharist in their mother tongue, Malayalam. In the beginning, they worshipped using a Malayalam adaptation of the West Syriac Liturgy of Saint James, which did not have ingredients considered unscriptural by Anglicans. By 1840, this was replaced by a Malayalam rendition of the Book of Common Prayer.

== British Period ==
The first Anglican congregations of Travancore were entirely of Syrian extraction. The social order of 19th century Travancore was based on a rigid caste system, which served as the backbone of its agricultural subsistence economy and hence reinforced harshly by local rulers. The subhuman treatment of the majority, constituted by lower and outcaste groups, was very conspicuous under this system. The missionaries naturally felt the urge to do something about it.

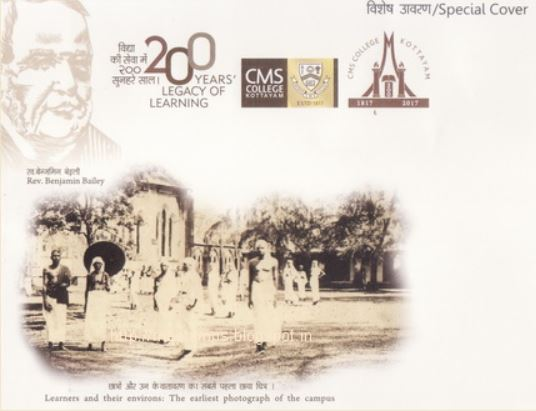
Founding principal Benjamin Bailey and 19th century CMS College campus, depicted on India Post bicentennial special envelope

=== British approach to caste system ===
The British missionaries differed on the question of how to deal with caste system. The older more tenured missionaries favoured a cautious, long term strategy that involved St. Thomas Anglicans. They set up a network of educational institutions, staffed by well-trained Anglican Syrians, to draw upper castes to their missions. This included the Cotym College, the oldest college of Kerala and the second oldest of India. They also started the C.M.S. Press, the first printing press of Kerala. With these initiatives, the CMS missionaries became the pioneers, who promoted modern education in Travancore. In their view, the evangelization and enlightenment of upper classes was the key to social change.

The younger missionaries, believed that the slave classes have suffered long enough and any procrastination on their part, to improve the conditions of outcastes, was very unchristian. They also wanted to the use the influence that the British administration wielded over local rulers, to quicken the evangelization and emancipation of slaves. They began to proselytize lower castes.

=== Anglican Syrians and caste ===
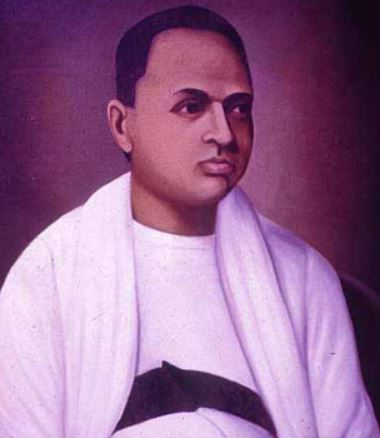
Rev. George Mathan is an example of an assimilated Saint Thomas Anglican priest, without the customary beard and black cap of Malankara Jacobites

Anglican Syrians were fully supportive of religious reform, but did not hold progressive social views. They vehemently opposed the conversion of lower castes. As the Syrians understood it, caste was an essential Character Indelebilis, received by birth, which remains unaffected by one's religious faith, change of it, or even lack thereof. So they continued to observe pollution rules. In Thalavady, when a British missionary brought in low caste converts to a Syrian–Anglican congregation, the Syrians leaped out through the windows and fled. For several of them, this was a journey back to their Orthodox mother church. Syrian–Anglicans objected to the admittance of slaves to CMS educational institutions. Hence, the British Anglicans had to condone separate congregations for Syrians and outcastes, for almost the whole of nineteenth century.

As years and decades passed by, many Syrian–Anglicans came to understand that being agents of progressive change was nothing but partaking in the redemptive work of Christ. So gradually, several of them went all-in for social reform. St. Thomas Anglican missionaries like Rev. George Mathan, Rev. Jacob Chandy Sr., Rev K. Koshy, Rev. Oommen Mammen and Rev. J. Eapen, started to evangelize outcastes and work for their upliftment. CMS educational institutions became open for all. Notwithstanding all these, Anglican Syrians still continued as an in-marrying community.

=== Attitudes of other Syrians ===
A diagram showing the history of the divisions among the Saint Thomas Christians.

Other Syrians believed that their kinsmen in the Anglican Church, were about to bring calamity upon all St. Thomas Christians. They feared that the co-existence of Syrians and outcastes, even within a single Christian denomination, will result in the degradation and ousting of the entire Syrian Christian community, as polluting. They even pointed out for the benefit of other higher caste Hindus, so that they may avoid ritual defilement, any low caste convert who ventured to walk on public roads, and thereby pass for a Syrian.

St. Thomas Christians shared the prevalent view among higher castes that slaves, once enlightened, may no longer be docile; a very undesirable change that could ultimately lead up to their regrettable liberation. Such a scenario, which would disrupt the long-standing class structure of Travancore and shake the foundation of its economy, was inconceivable to high-caste groups. For this reason, the Anglican Syrian evangelists, who worked for the betterment of the deprived and destitute, were viewed as the enemies of state.

Saint Thomas Anglicans also tried to gain more Syrian recruits to their Church. They staged fiery revival meetings, exhorting attendees to rise up against popery, idolatry and various unchristian abuses. This sometimes resulted in tussles with other Syrians. In 1852, a Syrian–Catholic cleric made a bonfire out CMS tracts, in Kottayam. In 1861, a Malankara Syrian Cattanar spat on the translated New Testament, distributed by a CMS volunteer. In some other instances, Anglican Syrians joined hands with the pro-Reform lobby within the Malankara Church and publicly smashed several fetishized Syrian idols, provoking riots at times.

After these tumultuous times, by 1900, the sectarian boundaries with the Saint Thomas Christian population, somewhat stabilized. Albeit being a minority, early access to Western-style education, enabled Anglican Syrian Christians to achieve positions of leadership in government and society, that was perceptibly disproportionate to their share of the population.

=== Travancore–Cochin diocese of the Church of India, Burma & Ceylon ===
The Diocese of Travancore and Cochin of the Church of England was established in 1879. The ecclesiastical hierarchy of the Travancore–Cochin diocese was composed almost entirely of St. Thomas Christians. The highest rank attained by native Indians within the Anglican Church, in the 19th century, was that of an Archdeacon. Rev. K. Koshy (Adn. 1885), an Anglican Syrian from the Travancore–Cochin diocese, was the first to raised to this position. This was followed by several others like Adn. Oommen Mammen (1902), Adn. Jacob Chandy Jr. (1906) and Adn. CK Jacob (1932).

In 1930, the Anglican dioceses in British India coalesced under the Metropolitan see of Calcutta, creating the autonomous Church of India, Burma and Ceylon, within the Anglican Communion. On 6 May 1945, Archdeacon C.K. Jacob was consecrated as bishop to the Travancore–Cochin diocese; the first native to hold that post. He was only the second Indian to be elevated to bishopric in the Anglican Church, after Rt. Rev. V. S. Azariah (Bp. 1912).

== Formation of the Church of South India ==
=== Background ===
The pressure for the Indianization of the Anglican Church for the greater good, originally came from the British churchmen, serving in India, from last decades of the 19th century. This combined with the growing nationalist sentiments of Indian Protestants, who came under the sway of the Indian independence movement, inspired the idea of a united Indian Church. They were desirous of an indigenous Church leadership and governance, free of foreign control. Such a union was also meant to be an act of true Christian witness to the pluralistic Indian society, in which Christians constituted a small minority. The Anglican efforts in this direction began with the Tranquebar conferences of May 1919, convened by bishop V. S. Azariah of the Anglican Diocese of Dornakal.

=== Negotiations ===
During the extensive dialogues that preceded the formation of the Church of South India, the Anglican party while accepting the ministries of all uniting denominations, argued for the introduction of an episcopate in historic succession from the Anglican Church into the envisioned United Church, by bestowing episcopal ordinations upon all candidates to bishoprics drawn from non-episcopal traditions. They also insisted that all ordinations after the union should be exclusively episcopal, conferred only by existing bishops with the imposition of hands, so that in the fullness of time, the entire ministry of the United Church would be in apostolic succession. These were eventually accepted.

=== Bishop Cherakarottu Korula Jacob and the inauguration of the CSI ===
Due to the death of bishop Azariah in 1945, C. K. Jacob of the Travancore–Cochin diocese, transpired as the sole native bishop of the CIBC. In 1946, bishop Jacob, along with the bishops of the other South Indian dioceses of the CIBC, issued a signed statement that they have no objections to receiving the Eucharist, from any presbyter of the United Church, given that no non-episcopal ordained presbyter would minister to a congregation that conscientiously objects to his ministry. This declaration made in an atmosphere of strong Anglo-Catholic opposition, was a major milestone towards unification. He also contributed significantly to the last joint committee of the uniting Churches in 1947.

On 27 September 1947, during the inaugural service of the United Church, the presiding bishop Rt. Rev. Cherakarottu Korula Jacob, by the following proclamation, declared the Church of South India, as made:

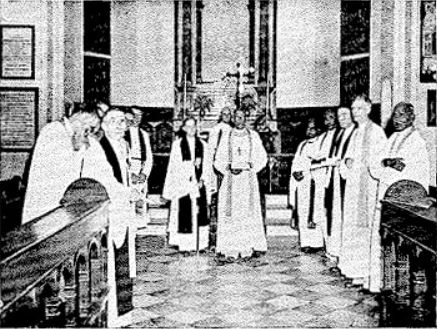
Bishop C.K. Jacob (middle–front) presiding over the inauguration of the CSI, on 27 September 1947

Dearly beloved brethren, in obedience to the Lord Jesus Christ, the Head of the Church, Who on the night of His Passion prayed that His disciples might be one; and by authority of the governing bodies of the uniting Churches, whose resolutions have been read in your hearing and laid in prayer before Almighty God; I do hereby declare that these three Churches, namely:

the Madras, Travancore and Cochin, Tinnevelly, and Dornakal Dioceses of the Church of India, Burma and Ceylon; the Madras, Madura, Malabar, Jaffna, Kannada, Telugu and Travancore Church Councils of the South India United Church; and the Methodist Church in South India, comprising the Madras, Trichinopoly, Hyderabad and Mysore Districts;

are become one Church of South India, and that those bishops, presbyters, deacons and probationers who have assented to the Basis of Union and accepted the Constitution of the Church of South India, whose names are laid upon this holy table, are bishops, presbyters and deacons of this Church: in the name of the Father, and of the Son, and of the Holy Spirit. Amen.

Afterwards, bishop Jacob, along with other Anglican bishops and senior presbyters of the uniting denominations, vested all new candidates to bishoprics with episcopal ordinations. By 1965, eighty-five percent of CSI clergy were episcopally ordained.

== St. Thomas Anglicans within the Church of South India ==
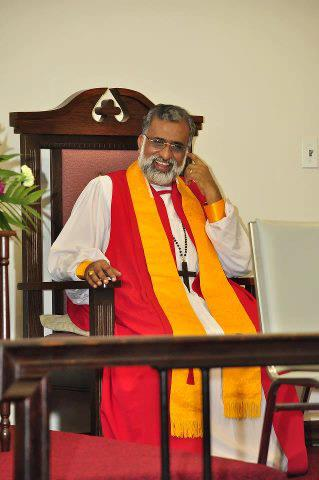
Bishop Thomas K. Oommen was the Moderator of the CSI from January 2017 to January 2020

After acceding to the CSI, the Anglican Diocese of Travancore and Cochin was renamed as the Madhya Kerala Diocese of the Church of South India and Anglican Syrian Christians came to be known as CSI Syrian Christians, too. Bishop C.K. Jacob served as the first Deputy Moderator of the CSI from 1948 to 1950.

While the CSI liturgy and rite was being developed, there was a recommendation to observe the Kiss of Peace with congregational participation, as in the local Syrian Churches. Malankara Syrians actually passed greetings hand-to-hand throughout the entire congregation, unlike in the Western Church, where it was greatly reduced or limited to the clergy. Bishop C.K. Jacob, despite being of Syrian stock, opposed it on the grounds that the Syrian Kiss of Peace was completely hypocritical, considering the bitter factionalism and incessant feuds among them. But others supported its inclusion, as this local practice was evidently prevalent in the Early Church. Thus it got incorporated into the CSI rite.

Even within the Church of South India, Anglican Syrians continued as an endogamous community. In protest against the casteism and domination of Syrian Christians in the Central Kerala Diocese, a group of Dalit Christians under the leadership of Rev. V.J. Stephen, seceded from the CSI in 1964.

The next St. Thomas Anglican to raised to the rank of Deputy Moderator is bishop Thomas K. Oommen. He was ordained as the bishop of the Madhya Kerala Diocese on 5 March 2011. In January 2014, he was elected the Deputy Moderator of Church of South India. Later, in January 2017, he was chosen as the Moderator and Primate of Church of South India and continued in that office till January 2020.

== Relations with other Saint Thomas Christians ==
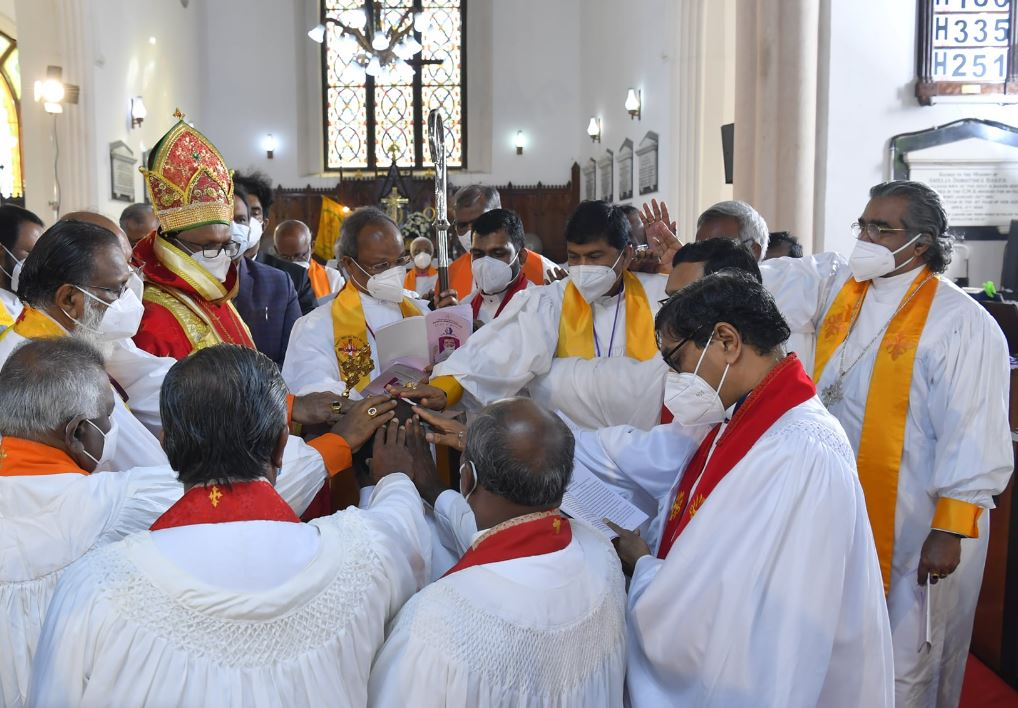
Laying on of hands by CSI Moderator Dharmaraj Rasalam, Theodosius Mar Thoma Metropolitan and other bishops, during the bishopric consecration of Sabu Koshy Cherian

By 1889, the reformists of the Malankara Church separated and established the Mar Thoma Church. This Reformed Syrian Church is in full communion with the Church of South India.

By the dawn of the 20th century, the shifting of Syrians between Anglican and Orthodox confessions ceased and thereafter, the original cordiality between the Anglican and Orthodox Churches revived. In the celebration of 1916, that marked the centenary of the CMS mission to Travancore, the head bishops and clergy of the various Syrian factions thankfully acknowledged how much they owed the missionaries, who gave them the Bible in Malayalam as well as Syriac, and reminisced the multitude of Malankara Syrians that passed through the CMS College Ever since, the relation between Anglican and Orthodox Churches has been of friendly cooperation. This continues between the CSI and the Orthodox and Jacobite factions of the old Malankara Church.

For all the ecclesiastical divisions among Saint Thomas Christians, they still constitute a single caste, on the whole. Hence, it is not uncommon for CSI, Orthodox, Jacobite and Mar Thoma Syrians to marry from and into one another's Churches. But the caste identity is maintained almost invariably, even while sectarian allegiance is switched through such marriages.

== Demographics ==
The roots of the majority of CSI Syrian Christians lie in the Madhya Kerala Diocese. However, after Indian independence, many of them moved out of Kerala to other Indian states and the rest of the world, starting new congregations. Many of these congregations are outside the South Indian Anglican province and hence fall under the ecclesiastical jurisdiction of the respective provincial bishops, at least technically. Hence, the task of determining the cumulative number of Syrian Christians in the South Indian and other global Anglican provinces, is quite challenging. However, sources generally tend to approximate it at 200,000. This is about 5 percent of the 4 million members of the Church of South India.

== A progressive community of several firsts ==
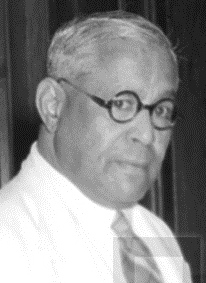
Dr. John Matthai in 1949

The association with the Church Mission Society, worked to the advantage of Anglican Syrian Christians, for they soon surfaced as a community of several firsts. Rev. George Mathan was not only an early Syrian–Anglican priest; he was also the first Malayali to produce an authoritative Grammar Book for Malayalam (1863), in Malayalam.

In the 19th century, Anglican Syrians became the pathfinders among Saint Thomas Christians, in education. Ergo, they were the first to express discontent at the Travancore government's policy of excluding Christians from high public offices. T. C. Poonen was the first Malayali to study law in England. In 1872, he was called to the Bar of England and Wales. However, he later returned to India, and was refused a post in the Travancore Government Service. Even so, he received posting as a judge, in the neighbouring Princely State of Cochin. In April 1898, leading Syrian Christians of all sects, formed the Travancore and Cochin Christian Association, to deal with the discriminatory policies of the government and promote their interests. Barrister T.C. Poonen was its first President. Owing to the various socio-political movements, which began from the late 19th century, the Travancore administration became a lot more inclusive and representative in the 20th century.

Padma Vibhushan Dr. John Matthai was the first Malayali to become a cabinet minister for independent India, handling Railways and later Finance portfolios. He was also the first chairman of the State Bank of India. Padma Vibhushan Dr. Verghese Kurien aka the Father of the White Revolution in India, was a social entrepreneur whose ideas and leadership, made India the world's largest milk producer. Padma Bhushan Dr. Jacob Chandy, the son of archdeacon Jacob Chandy Jr. was the first neurosurgeon of India. He is regarded as the father of modern neurosurgery in India, due to his trailblazing work in that specialty.

Historically, Saint Thomas Christians have been a downright male-dominant community. So, the right to inheritance, was solely confined to male descendants. From the early 20th century itself, Anglican Syrians like Justice P. Cherian were at the forefront of Syrian Christian women's rights causes. They advocated the passing of a new law, like the Indian Succession Act of 1865, that granted greater property rights to women. This eventually brought forth the Travancore Christian Succession Act of 1916, although a daughter's share in ancestral property, in lieu of dowry, was limited to a 4th of that of a son, due to fierce opposition from conservative Syrians.

Padma Shri Dr. Mary Poonen Lukose, was the first Malayali woman to earn a bachelor's degree, as well as the first Malayali woman to graduate in medicine, from Britain. Mary was the first female legislator (1922) of Travancore. Mary was also the first female Surgeon General (1938) of British India. She is reported to have been the first woman Surgeon General in the world; the first in the US, being appointed only in 1990. Mary Poonen, the niece of barrister T.C. Poonen, married K.K. Lukose, a Malankara Orthodox lawyer (later judge), and son of K.K. Kuruvilla, who was one of the most adamant opponents of women's inheritance rights. Independent scholars like Dr. Robin Jeffrey have opined that the death of Mr. Kuruvilla, prior to his son's marriage, along with the unqualified support Mary received from her well-educated husband, may have contributed positively to the building of her exemplary career.

Educator Mary Roy, almost single-handedly fought a legal battle (dubbed Mary Roy case), to overturn the archaic Travancore Christian Succession Act and its Cochin counterpart. The final verdict of 1986, accorded all Syrian Christian women, equal property rights as their male siblings. Suzanna Arundhati Roy, the first Indian national to win the Booker Prize for Literature (1997), is Mary Roy's daughter. Historical facets of Saint Thomas Anglican life and culture like missionaries, Syrianness, casteism, slaves, bygone Anglophilia etc. feature detectably in her award-winning novel, The God of Small Things.

== Gallery ==
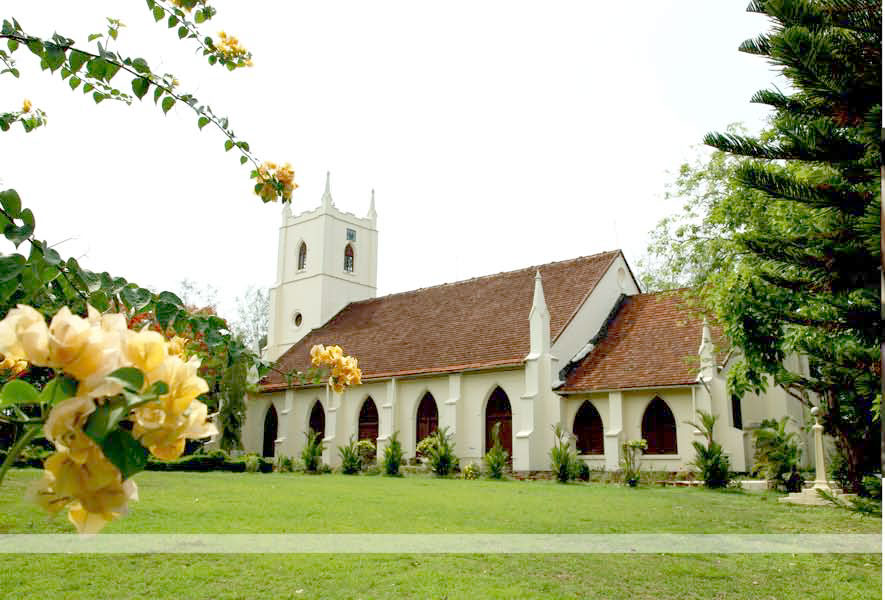
CSI Holy Trinity Cathedral, Kottayam

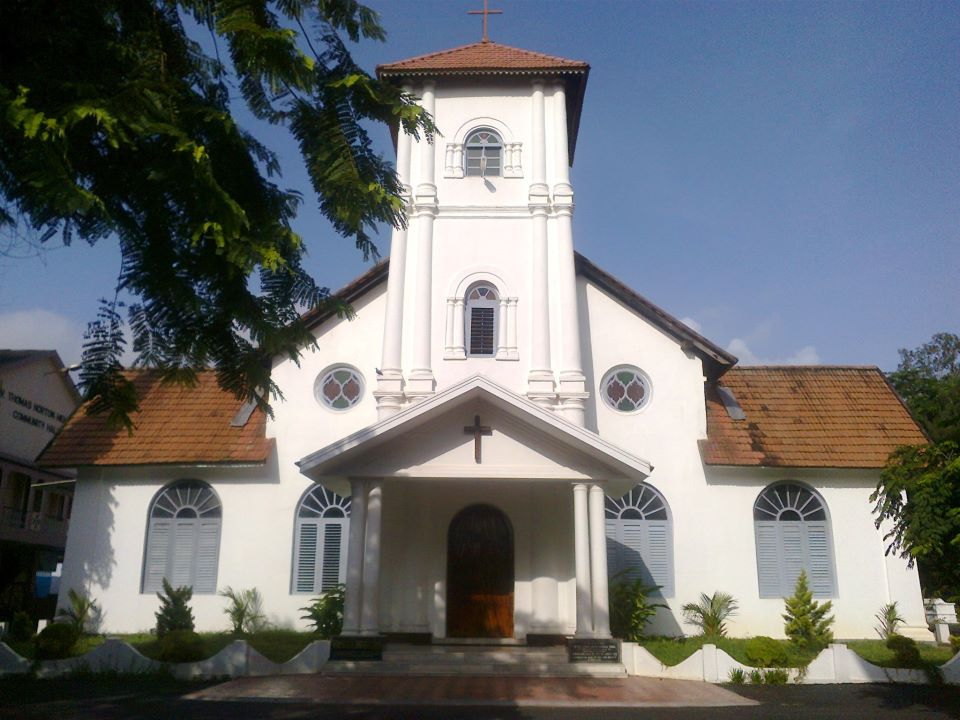
CSI Christ Church, Alappuzha

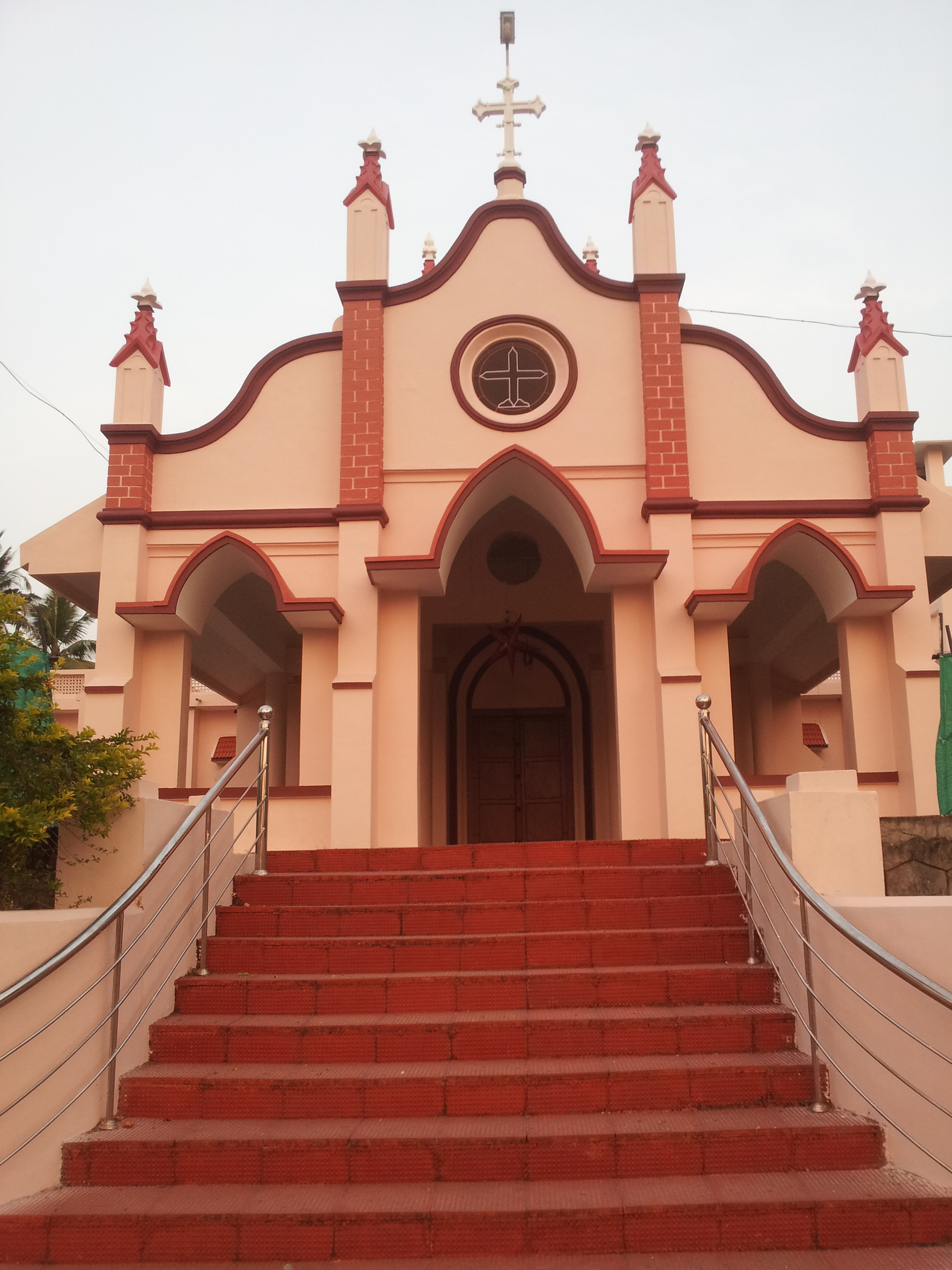
CSI Christ Church Kodukulanji

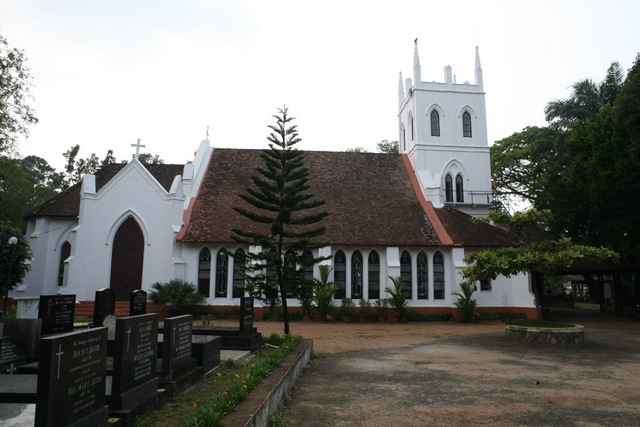
CSI Christ Church, Thiruvananthapuram

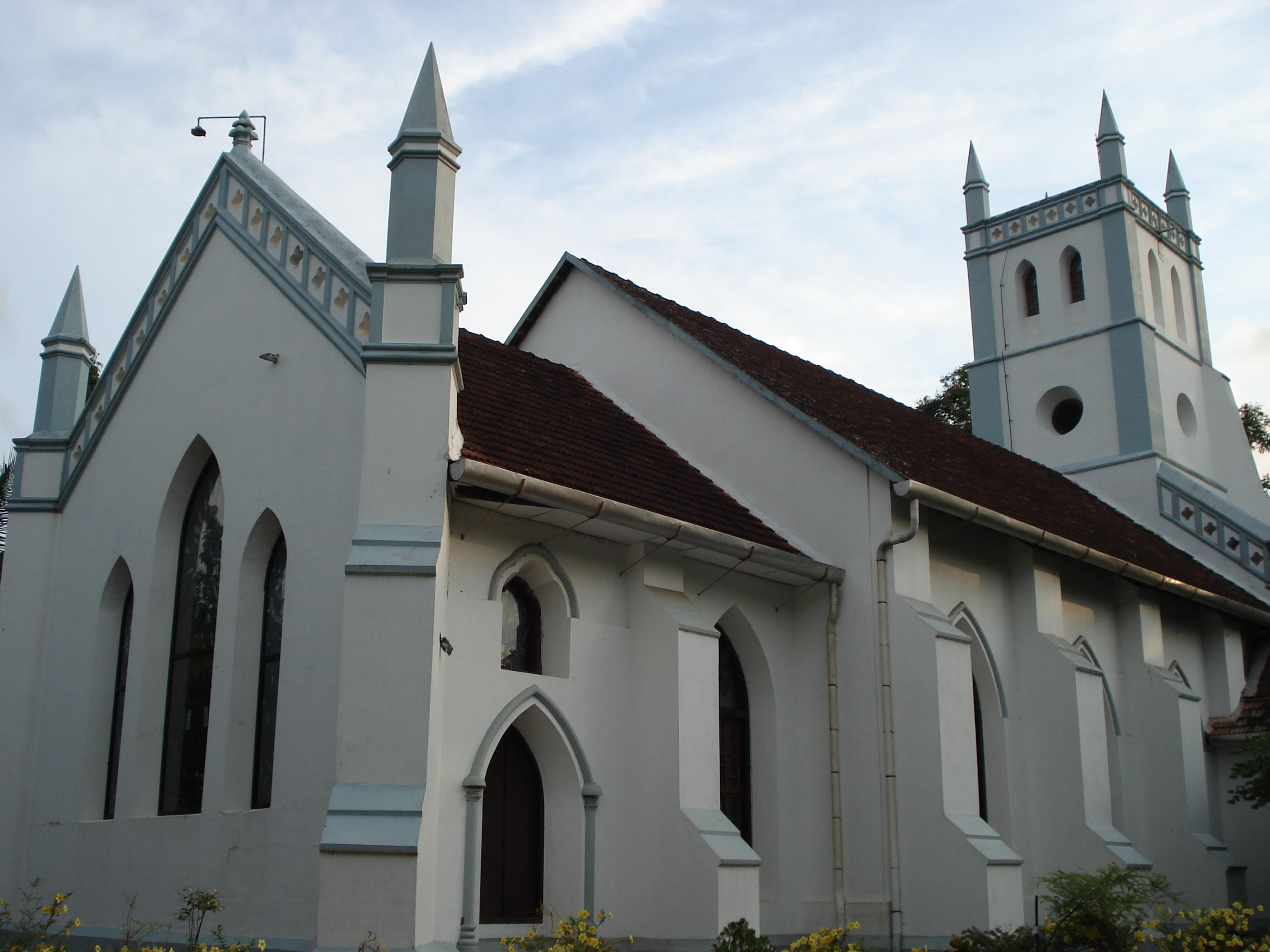
CSI Christ Church, Mavelikara

== See also ==
- Church Missionary Society in India

== Sources ==
- Abraham, Jacob; Mathai, K. V.; Rajshekhar, Vedantam; Narayan, Raj K. (1 September 2010). "Jacob Chandy: Pioneering Neurosurgeon of India". Neurosurgery. 67 (3): 567–75, discussion 575-6. doi:10.1227/01.NEU.0000374769.83712.E1. ISSN 0148-396X. PMID 20647965.
- Aiya, V. Nagam (1906). The Travancore State Manual. Vol. 1. Travancore Government Press.
- Bayly, Susan (2004). "The collapse of Syrian Christian 'integration'". Saints, Goddesses and Kings: Muslims and Christians in South Indian Society. Cambridge University Press. ISBN 0-521-89103-5.
- Buchanan, Claudius (1811). Christian researches in Asia. Boston: Samuel T. Armstrong. (Christian researches in Asia at the Internet Archive)
- Buchanan, Colin (4 August 2009). The A to Z of Anglicanism. Scarecrow Press. ISBN 978-0-8108-7008-6.
- Chatterton, Eyre (1924). "The Diocese of Travancore and Cochin, 1879. The Country of Fiords, Mountains, and Moplahs Bishops". A History of the Church of England in India Since the Early Days of the East India Company. London: SPCK.
- Chiriyankandath, James Lazar (1985). "Part 1. Chapter 3. Communities: Social Reform and Identity". Social Change and the Development of 'modern' Politics in Travancore, from the Late Nineteenth Century to 1938. SOAS University of London. pp. 63–89, 173, 175, 183.
- "Kerala to celebrate CMS mission" (Press release). Church Mission Society. 9 November 2016.
- Commission, Faith & Order (1952). The Third World Conference on Faith and Order, Lund 1952: Who's who - Wer Ist's - Qui Êtes-vous?. Vol. 13. Lund, Sweden: Hakan Ohlessons Boktryckeri. (The Third World Conference on Faith and Order, Lund 1952: Who's who - Wer Ist's - Qui Êtes-vous? at the Internet Archive)
- "The Order of Service for the Inauguration of Church Union in South India". anglicanhistory.org. 1947.
- Deshmukh, Dr. C.D. (1972). Reflections on Finance Education and Society. Motilal Banarsidass Publications. ISBN 978-81-208-3075-2.
- Ernst, Waltraud; Pati, Biswamoy; Sekher, T. V. (2017). Health and Medicine in the Indian Princely States: 1850-1950. Taylor & Francis. ISBN 978-1-351-67843-8.
- Ezhuthachan, K.N. (1975). The History of the Grammatical Theories in Malayalam. Vol. 17. Dravidian Linguistics Association.
- Fahlbusch, Erwin (1999). "India". The Encyclopedia of Christianity. Vol. 2. Wm. B. Eerdmans Publishing. ISBN 978-90-04-11695-5.
- Fenwick, John; Spinks, Bryan (1995). Worship in Transition: The Twentieth Century Liturgical Movement. A&C Black. ISBN 978-0-8264-0827-3.
- Forrester, Duncan B. (2017). "V. Caste Converts and the Kerala Christians". Caste and Christianity: Attitudes and Policies on Caste of Anglo-Saxon Protestant Missions in India. Routledge. ISBN 978-1-351-80207-9.
- Fortescue, Adrian (1913). The Lesser Eastern Churches. AMS Press. ISBN 978-0-404-02517-5.
- Frykenberg, Robert Eric (2008). "9. Missionaries, Colonialism, and Ecclesiastical Dominion". Christianity in India: From Beginnings to the Present. OUP Oxford. ISBN 978-0-19-826377-7.
- Gregorios, Dr. Paulos (1982). The Orthodox Church in India: An Overview. New Delhi: Sophia Publications.
- Gregorios, Paulos; Roberson, Ronald G. (2008). "Syrian Orthodox Churches in India". In Fahlbusch, Erwin; Bromiley, Geoffrey William; Lochman, Jan Milic; Mbiti, John; Pelikan, Jaroslav (eds.). The Encyclopedia of Christianity. Wm. B. Eerdmans Publishing. ISBN 9780802824172.
- Haridasan, Valiyaveettil (2000). Dr. John Matthai, 1886-1959: A Biography. Publication Division, University of Calicut. ISBN 978-81-7748-008-5.
- Harper, Susan Billington (2000). In the Shadow of the Mahatma: Bishop V.S. Azariah and the Travails of Christianity in British India. Wm. B. Eerdmans Publishing. ISBN 978-0-8028-3874-2.
- Rev. C. Y. Thomas. "History of the CSI Central Kerala Diocese, Chapters 1, 2 & 3". www.csimichigan.org.
- Hood, Frederic (September 1935). "Some Comments on the South India Scheme". Church Literature Association.
- Hough, James (1860). The History of Christianity in India: From the Commencement of the Christian Era. Vol. 5. R.B. Seeley and W. Burnside: and sold by L. and G. Seeley, Fleet Street, London.
- Jeffrey, Robin (1976). The Decline of Nayar Dominance: Society and Politics in Travancore, 1847-1908. Vikas Publishing House. ISBN 978-0-7069-0486-4.
- Jeffrey, Robin (2016). Politics, Women and Well-Being: How Kerala became 'a Model'. Springer. ISBN 978-1-349-12252-3.
- Joseph, Abraham (2015). Is History of Human Race Coming to an End?. D C Books. ISBN 978-93-81699-38-6.
- Kamath, M. V. (1996). Milkman from Anand: The Story of Verghese Kurien. Konark Publishers. ISBN 978-81-220-0413-7.
- Kawashima, Kōji (1998). Missionaries and a Hindu State: Travancore, 1858-1936. Oxford University Press. ISBN 978-0-19-564318-3.
- Livingstone, E. A., ed. (2006). "Church of South India". The Concise Oxford Dictionary of the Christian Church. Oxford University Press. ISBN 9780198614425.
- MacKenzie, Gordon Thomson (1901). Christianity in Travancore. Printed at Travancore Government Press.
- Macnally, Jane; Carey, William (2005). Abuse of Christian Women in India. William Carey Library. ISBN 978-0-87808-347-3.
- Mathew, E. T. (25 September 1999). "Growth of Literacy in Kerala". Economic and Political Weekly. 34 (39).
- Melton, J. Gordon; Baumann, Martin (2010). "Church of South India". Religions of the World: A Comprehensive Encyclopedia of Beliefs and Practices, 2nd Edition [6 volumes]. ABC-CLIO. ISBN 978-1-59884-204-3.
- Menon, T. Madhava (2002). A handbook of Kerala. Vol. 2. International School of Dravidian Linguistics. ISBN 978-81-85692-31-9.
- Menon, P. Shungoonny (1878). History of Travancore from the Earliest Times. Vol. 2. Madras: Higginbotham and Co. ISBN 9788120601697. (History of Travancore from the Earliest Times at the Internet Archive)
- Menon, Sreedhara (1996). A survey of Kerala History. Madras: S.Viswanathan Printers and Publishers. ISBN 9788126415786.
- Mohindra, K.S. (2009). "Mary Poonen Lukose - Hektoen International". Hektoen International Journal of Medical Humanities. Hektoen Institute of Medicine. ISSN 2155-3017.
- Mooken, Mar Aprem (1983). Indian Christian who is who. Bombay Parish Church of the East.
- Mukherjee, Sumita (2018). Indian Suffragettes: Female Identities and Transnational Networks. Oxford University Press. ISBN 978-0-19-909370-0.
- Nair, K. Rajasekharan (2001). "Dr. Mrs. Mary Poonen Lukose". Evolution of Modern Medicine in Kerala: Travancore. T. Indira Nair.
- Neill, Stephen (2 May 2002). A History of Christianity in India: 1707–1858. Cambridge University Press. ISBN 978-0-521-89332-9.
- "Mary Roy Case: Court Gives Key Verdict". Outlook India. 21 October 2010. Archived from the original on 12 December 2019.
- Pati, George (2019). "2. Place: caste, colonialism, and reforms in Kerala (1870–1924)". Religious Devotion and the Poetics of Reform: Love and Liberation in Malayalam Poetry. Routledge. ISBN 978-1-351-10359-6.
- Prasad, Amar Nath (2004). Arundhati Roy's The God of Small Things: A Critical Appraisal. Sarup & Sons. ISBN 978-81-7625-522-6.
- Presler, Titus (2017). "The Church of South India". In Sachs, William L. (ed.). The Oxford History of Anglicanism, Volume V: Global Anglicanism, C. 1910-2000. Oxford University Press. ISBN 978-0-19-252095-1.
- Pruthi, Dr. Raj Kumar (2004). Indian Caste System. New Delhi: Discovery Publishing House. ISBN 978-81-7141-847-3.
- Rajasekharan, G.; Kumar, K. Santhosh, eds. (March 2003). District Handbooks of Kerala KOTTAYAM (PDF). DEPARTMENT OF INFORMATION & PUBLIC RELATIONS GOVERNMENT OF KERALA. Archived from the original (PDF) on 19 March 2009.
- Ross, Israel J. (1979). "Ritual and Music in South India: Syrian Christian Liturgical Music in Kerala". Asian Music. 11 (1): 80–98. doi:10.2307/833968. JSTOR 833968.
- Sadasivan, S. N. (2000). "X. Social Change: Its Dialectics and Dynamics". A Social History of India. New Delhi: APH Publishing. ISBN 978-81-7648-170-0.
- Shaji, Dr. A (2017). Politicisation of Caste Relations in a Princely State. Gurgaon: Zorba Books. ISBN 978-93-87456-00-6.
- Society, A. B. (1959). Annual Report of the American Bible Society. Vol. 143. American Bible Society.
- Society, C. M. (1822). Missionary Register. London: Seeley, Jackson, & Halliday.
- Society, C. M. (1852). Church Missionary Record. London: Church Mission Society Archives.
- Society, C. M. (1861). Church Missionary Record. London: Church Mission Society Archives.
- Society, C.M. (1916). "The Travancore Centenary Celebrations". The Church Missionary Review. Vol. 67. Church Missionary Society.
- "President flags off bicentenary celebrations of Kottayam's CMS College". Business Standard. 26 February 2016.
- Sundkler, Bengt (1954). Church of South India: The Movement Towards Union, 1900-1947. Greenwich, Connecticut: Seabury Press.
- "Missionaries led State to renaissance: Pinarayi". The Hindu. 13 November 2016.
- "CSI bishop steps down". The Hindu. 28 November 2020.
- Thomas, Anthony Korah (1993). The Christians of Kerala: A Brief Profile of All Major Churches. Kottayam.
- Tovey, Philip Noel (1997). "1". Essays in West Syrian Liturgy. Kottayam: Oriental Institute of Religious Studies. pp. 7–27.
- Tovey, Phillip (7 January 2015). "Colonel John Munro Evangelical Christian". Kerala History. academia.edu.
- Vadakkekara, Benedict (2007). Origin of Christianity in India: A Historiographical Critique. Media House. ISBN 978-81-7495-258-5.
- Varma, Kocha. "John Munro". History of Cochin Royal Family.
- Ward, Kevin (2006). A History of Global Anglicanism. Cambridge University Press. ISBN 978-0-521-00866-2.
- Whitehouse, Thomas (1873). Lingerings of light in a dark land: researches into the Syrian church of Malabar. London: William Brown & Co.
- Yandell, Keith E.; Paul, John J. (2013). Religion and Public Culture: Encounters and Identities in Modern South India. Routledge. ISBN 978-1-136-81801-1.
- Zachariah, Kunniparampil Curien; Mathew, Elangikal Thomas; Rajan, Sebastian Irudaya (2003). Dynamics of Migration in Kerala: Dimensions, Differentials, and Consequences. Orient Blackswan. ISBN 978-81-250-2504-7.
