= Oommen Mammen =

Indian Anglican priest

The Venerable Oommen Mammen
- Archdeacon of Mavelikkara
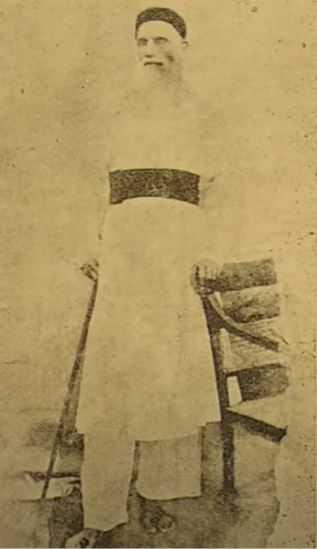
- Church: Church of England in British India
- Diocese: Anglican diocese of Travancore & Cochin
- Installed: 22 March 1900
- Term ended: 23 August 1904
- Predecessor: Archdeacon K. Koshy

Orders
- Ordination: 16 March 1856 (deacon); 9 November 1859 (priest) by Thomas Dealtry

Personal details
- Born: Oommen Mammen Tharakan; 1830
- Died: 1904
- Denomination: Oriental Orthodoxy (1830–1850); Anglicanism (1850–1904)
- Parents: Kuncheria Mammen Tharakan & Annamma Thoompunkal
- Spouse: Annamma Joseph
- Education: CMS College Kottayam

Oommen Mammen Tharakan (24 March 1830 – 23 August 1904) was an Indian Anglican priest and Malayalam litterateur.

== Early life ==
Oommen Mammen was born the son of Kuncheria Mammen Tharakan and Annamma Thoompunkal to the distinguished Nazrani family of Alummoottil in Puthencavu, near Chengannur. The hereditary honorific title 'Tharakan' was bestowed upon his family by a local Raja. They were members of the Malankara Syrian Church. When Oommen was just twenty-two days old, his father died. While Oommen was still an infant, his mother took him to St. Mary's Orthodox Church in Niranam, and dedicated him to the service of the Lord and the church.

By the time Oommen reached twelve years of age, his mother remarried, effectively rendering him an orphan. His relatives seized his paternal inheritance, and he was left in the care of his mother's sister's husband Rev. J. Tharian Parambil, in Mavelikkara.

== Education ==
Oommen studied Malayalam at the Anglican Church Mission Society school in Mavelikkara. At that time, British missionary Rev. J. Hawksworth took Oommen under his wing. Later, with Hawksworth's assistance, Oommen learned English at CMS College Kottayam, which was also run by Anglican missionaries. Under the influence of his missionary teachers, Oommen converted from Oriental Orthodoxy to Anglicanism.

== Ordinations and ministry ==
From 1851 to 1856, Oommen Mammen served as a travelling evangelist for the Church Mission Society in Travancore. He was ordained as deacon on 16 March 1856, by the Anglican bishop of Madras Rt. Rev. Thomas Dealtry. Subsequently, he was trained for priesthood by Anglican missionary priests Rev. Chapman, Rev. Hawksworth, Rev. Joseph Peet and Rev. Whitehead. On 9 November 1859, he was ordained a priest at the Holy Trinity Anglican Church in Kottayam.

As a priest, Oommen served in many Church of England parishes in Travancore and Cochin. He himself prepared a curriculum for Sunday School in 1868, whilst serving in Mallapally Anglican church. Oommen worked tirelessly for the upliftment of non-Christian Dalits, evangelizing and educating them, provoking the ire of forward caste people. The last twenty-four years (1880–1904) of his vocation was based out of the Christ Anglican church in Mavelikkara. Throughout his ministry, he remained close to the royal families of Mavelikkara and Travancore. On 22 March 1900, he was made the Archdeacon of Mavelikkara, the second Indian to be raised to that rank in the Church of England, after K. Koshy.

== Literary pursuits ==
Oommen was a prolific Malayalam writer, who authored eighteen books, of which some were translations from English to Malayalam. Pre-eminent Malayalam poet and literary scholar Ulloor S. Parameswara Iyer in his famous book Kerala Sahitya Charitram (History of Kerala Literature). ISBN 8193036840., has duly recognized Archdeacon Oommen Mammen's contributions to Malayalam literature. Oommen's works include,

- Athmeekaranam (Spiritualization)
- Rogathepattiyulla Dhyanam (Meditation on sickness)
- Uttama Sthreekalude Kathakal (Stories of noble women)
- Balapriyan (Children's friend), parts I and II
- Sukruthamulla Sthree (Virtuous woman)
- Salomonte Subhashithangal – translation of Charles Bridges's Exposition of Proverbs, in three volumes
- Ente Rajavu – translation of Frances Ridley Havergal's My King

== Personal life and descendants ==
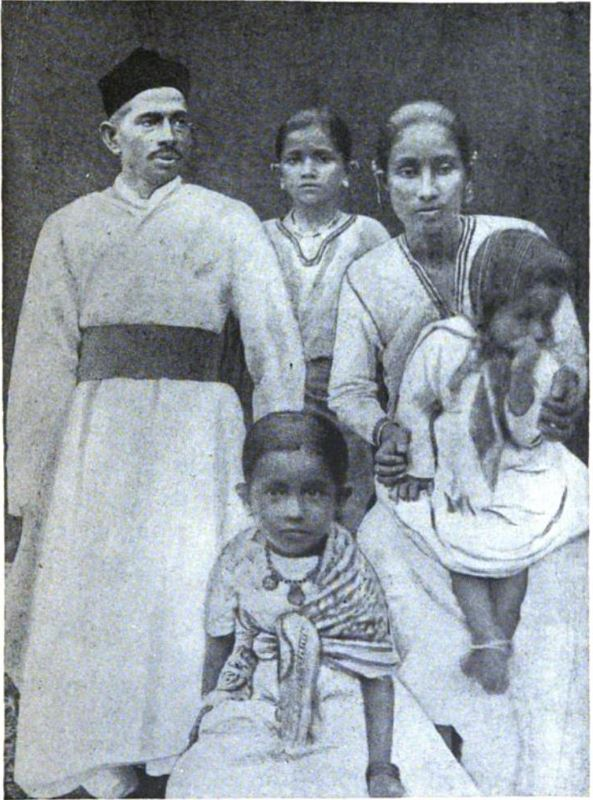
Syrian Anglican priest Kaipuredathu M. Matthai with his wife Achiamma (d/o archdeacon Oommen Mammen) and children

On 30 October 1851, Oommen Mammen married Annamma Joseph, daughter of Syrian Kathanar Joseph Vaidyan. Oommen's brother-in-law was also a Syrian priest. The marriage was solemnized by Rev. J Hawksworth at the Christ Anglican church in Mavelikkara.

Oommen and Annamma together had five sons and five daughters that survived into adulthood, and two other children, who died in infancy. Several of Oommen's descendants were clerics in the Diocese of Travancore and Cochin of the Church of England and its successor the Church of South India, as well as the Mar Thoma Syrian Church. This includes Rev. A. O. Matthai (son), Rev. A. V. George (grandson), Rev. K. V. Thomas (grandson) and Rev. A. Joseph Matthew (grandson) of the Anglican church, along with Most Rev. Alexander Mar Thoma Metropolitan (great-grandson through daughter Mariamma Anjilivelil) and Rev. P. M. Thomas (great-grandson) of the Mar Thoma Church. Additionally his sons-in-law Rev. Kaipuredathu M. Matthai and Rev. M. T. Chacko were also Church of England priests in British India. Former Kerala government Chief Secretary C. Thomas (IAS) is also his great-grandson through daughter Saramma Mullamangalam.

== Death ==
Oommen continued as archdeacon till his death on 23 August 1904. In response to the telegram intimating the news of the archdeacon's death, Kerala Varma Valiya Koil Thampuran of Travancore royal family replied, "I have lost an esteemed friend; the mission, a zealous worker; and the poor, a true benefactor". Oommen was laid to rest at the Mavelikkara Anglican cemetery. A memorial service was held in the Holy Trinity Anglican cathedral, Kottayam, on 4 September 1904.

== See also ==
- Saint Thomas Christians
- Saint Thomas Anglicans
- Church Missionary Society in India
- Christianity in Kerala

== Bibliography ==
- Thomas, Parumootil Joseph (1974). 100 Indian Witnesses to Jesus Christ. Bombay Tract and Book Society. pp. 112–113.
- Jeffrey, Robin (1976). The Decline of Nayar Dominance: Society and Politics in Travancore, 1847-1908. Vikas Publishing House. ISBN 978-0-7069-0486-4.
- Mooken, Mar Aprem (1983). Indian Christian who is who. Bombay Parish Church of the East.
- Addison, Henry Robert; Oakes, Charles Henry; Lawson, William John; Sladen, Douglas Brooke Wheelton (1905). Who's who. A. & C. Black. p. 1064.
- Thomas, M.C. (2010). Archdeacon Oommen Mammen (Biography) (in Malayalam). Trivandrum: Heritage Trust for Christian Research Publications and Charity. pp. 1–103.
- Idiculla, Dr. Shajan A. (2012). Douthyathinte Edukal (History of CSI Central Kerala Diocese) (in Malayalam). Kottayam: CMS Press. pp. 66–67.
- Chatterton, Eyre (1924). "The Diocese of Travancore and Cochin, 1879. The Country of Fiords, Mountains, and Moplahs Bishops". A History of the Church of England in India Since the Early Days of the East India Company. London: SPCK.
- "Former Chief Secretary C. Thomas dead". The Hindu. 8 August 2018.
- Nellimukal, Dr. Samuel (2013). Keralathile Samoohyaparivarthanam – The Social Transformation of Kerala (in Malayalam). Kottayam: K. S. Books. pp. 306–309.
- MacKenzie, Gordon Thomson (1901). Christianity in Travancore. Printed at Travancore Government Press. p. 48.
- Society, Church Missionary (1904). Proceedings of the Church Missionary Society for Africa and the East... Church Missionary House. p. 297.
- Stock, Eugene (1916). The History of the Church Missionary Society: Its Environment, Its Men and Its Work. Church Missionary Society. p. 198,251,253.
- Aiya, V. Nagam (1906). The Travancore State Manual. Travancore government Press. p. 220.
- Richards, William Joseph (1908). The Indian Christians of St. Thomas: Otherwise Called the Syrian Christians of Malabar : a Sketch of Their History and an Account of Their Present Condition as Well as a Discussion of the Legend of St. Thomas. Bemrose. pp. 114–115.
