= Bridge (surname) =

Bridge is a surname. Notable people with the surname include:

- Andrew Bridge (basketball) (born 1979), English basketball player
- Andrew Bridge (lighting designer), American lighting designer
- Basil Bridge (born 1938), English cricketer
- Bobbe Bridge, American judge
- Burnie Bridge (born 1948), American judge
- Candice Bridge, American chemist
- Chris Bridge (born 1984), English rugby league player
- Duncan Bridge (born 1958), retired English badminton player
- Ernest H. Bridge, American politician
- Ernie Bridge (1936–2013), Australian politician and singer
- Ernie Bridge (footballer), New Zealand soccer player
- Frank Bridge (1879–1941), English composer and violist
- Frankie Bridge (born 1989), English singer-songwriter
- Frederick Bridge (1844–1924), English composer and organist
- Graeme Bridge (born 1980), English cricketer
- Herbert S. Bridge, American physicist
- Ian Bridge (born 1959), Canadian soccer player
- Jack Bridge (born 1995), English footballer
- Jane Bridge (born 1960), English judoka
- John Bridge (1915–2006), English naval bomb disposal expert, and writer
- Jonathan Bridge (born 1966), English actor
- Joseph Cox Bridge (1853–1929), English organist and composer
- Karen Bridge, English badminton player
- Mark Bridge (born 1985), Australian soccer player
- Steph Bridge (born 1972), British kitesurfer
- T. W. Bridge (1848–1909), British zoologist
- Wayne Bridge (born 1980), English footballer

== See also ==
- Bridges (surname)
