= T. C. Poonen =

Travancorean judge

T. C. Poonen Esquire

Zilla Court, Kingdom of Cochin
- In office 1876–1894

Member of Legislative Council
- In office 1899–1901
- Monarch: Moolam Thirunal Rama Varma

Personal details
- Born: 1847 Kottayam, Travancore
- Died: 1901 Travancore
- Known for: First Malayali to be educated in Britain; Founder of the first wholly Travancore bank

Therakathu C. Poonen (1847–1901) was a Travancorean judge and Member of Legislative Council.

== Early life and education ==
Poonen was born into the Saint Thomas Anglican family of Therakathu, in Kottayam, Travancore. He began schooling at the C.MS College School in Kottayam. In 1864, he matriculated from the Government Provincial School of Calicut.

In 1869, he earned a BA from Presidency College, Madras. The same year, he was awarded a government scholarship for higher studies and moved to England. T. C. Poonen has the distinction of being the first Malayalee to be educated in Britain.

== Legal and business career ==
After qualifying as a lawyer, Poonen was called to the Bar of England and Wales from the Inner Temple, in 1872. However, he chose to return to Travancore.

In the nineteenth century, the high offices of Travancore government were reserved for high caste Hindus, because they were also required to supervise the temples and feeding houses (Oottu Puras) for Brahmins. So, T. C. Poonen was refused a government job, in accordance to his merit. Thus, for sometime, he practiced law, as a barrister, in Tellicherri. However, in 1876, he received posting as a judge, in the neighbouring Princely State of Cochin. He retired in 1894 and started the first wholly Travancore bank, in Kottayam. But, the bank failed.

== Political career ==
In April 1898, leading Syrian Christians of all sects, formed the Travancore and Cochin Christian Association, to promote their interests and to deal with the discriminatory policies of the government. Barrister Poonen was its first President. In 1899, T. C. Poonen succeeded K. K. Kuruvilla, as the only Saint Thomas Christian representative to the Travancore Legislative Council (precursor to Sree Moolam Popular Assembly), constituted by Maharajah Moolam Thirunal Rama Varma.

Under the leadership of T. C. Poonen, the Travancore and Cochin Christian Association submitted a memorial to Dewan K. Krishnaswamy Rao, demanding the dissociation of temple duties from executive offices, competitive exams for higher government posts and a more representative composition of administration. As the Dewan wasn't sympathetic, the association approached Viceroy Lord Curzon, on his visit to Travancore, in November 1900. But he declined to interfere in regional affairs.

T. C. Poonen died in 1901; but the causes that he and several of his contemporaries stood for, did not. The various socio-political movements that began from late 19th century, transformed Travancore, and its administration became much more inclusive and representative in the 20th century.

== Bibliography ==
- Chiriyankandath, James Lazar (1985). "Part 1. Chapter 3. Communities: Social Reform and Identity". Social Change and the Development of 'modern' Politics in Travancore, from the Late Nineteenth Century to 1938. SOAS University of London. pp. 63–89, 173, 175, 183.
- Jeffrey, Robin (1976). The Decline of Nayar Dominance: Society and Politics in Travancore, 1847-1908. Vikas Publishing House. ISBN 978-0-7069-0486-4.
- Mateer, Samuel (1871). "The Land of Charity:": A Descriptive Account of Travancore and Its People, with Especial Reference to Missionary Labour. J. Snow and Company.
- Ward, Kevin (2006). A History of Global Anglicanism. Cambridge University Press. ISBN 978-0-521-00866-2.
- Yandell, Keith E.; Paul, John J. (2013). Religion and Public Culture: Encounters and Identities in Modern South India. Routledge. ISBN 978-1-136-81801-1.
- Haridasan, Valiyaveettil (2000). Dr. John Matthai, 1886-1959: A Biography. Publication Division, University of Calicut. ISBN 978-81-7748-008-5.
- Sadasivan, S. N. (2000). "X. Social Change: Its Dialectics and Dynamics". A Social History of India. New Delhi: APH Publishing. ISBN 978-81-7648-170-0.
- Shaji, Dr. A (2017). Politicisation of Caste Relations in a Princely State. Gurgaon: Zorba Books. ISBN 978-93-87456-00-6.
