= Peter Bridges =

Peter or Pete Bridges may refer to:

- Peter Bridges (priest) (1925–2015), English ecclesiastical figure and academic
- Peter Bridges (diplomat) (1932–2022), American author and diplomat
- Pete Bridges, American council member and mayor of Tallapoosa, Georgia
- Peter Bridges, English television sound engineer, winner at 2013 British Academy Television Craft Awards

== See also ==
- Bridges (surname)
