= Archdeacon K. Koshy =

Indian priest

The Venerable K. Koshy
- Archdeacon of Mavelikkara
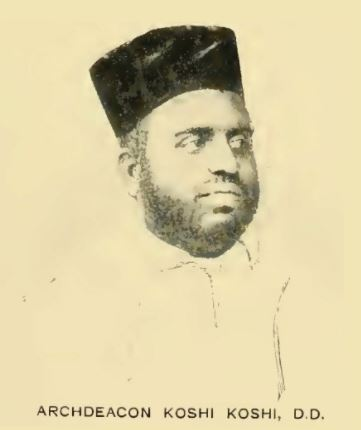
- Diocese: Anglican diocese of Travancore & Cochin
- In office: 1885–1899
- Successor: Oommen Mammen

Orders
- Ordination: 1856 (deacon); 1859 (priest)

Personal details
- Born: Koshy Koshy; 1825
- Died: 1899
- Denomination: Malankara Church (1825–1836); Anglican Church (1836–1899)
- Education: Pazhaya Seminary, Kottayam

Koshy Koshy also spelled as Koshi Koshi (1825–1899) was an Indian Anglican priest and Malayalam novelist.

== Early life ==
K. Koshy was born in the Kingdom of Travancore, to a Nazrani family, part of the Malankara Syrian Church. His parents were Koshy Mullamangalam and Annamma. When he was 11 years old (1836), his family converted to Anglicanism, under the influence of the Church Mission Society.

== Priesthood ==
Koshy desired to enter his Church's ministry and studied at the Pazhaya Seminary, Kottayam. By 1844, he was a scholar in Sanskrit, Latin and English languages. In 1856, he was received into the diaconate. In 1859, he was ordained as a priest in the Anglican Church. In the nineteenth century, the highest office attained by Indians within the Anglican Church was that of an archdeacon. In 1885, Rev. K. Koshy became the first Indian to be raised to the rank of an archdeacon.

== Literary pursuits ==
Adn. K. Koshy was one of the original Malayalam litterateurs. He wrote over 10 books, including Pulleli Kunju, Bhasmakuri and Thiruvavatharamahatmyam. Pulleli Kunju (1882) is regarded as the first novellike original work on a local theme, in Malayalam. He also translated John Bunyan's The Pilgrim's Progress (Paradesi Mokshayathra, 1845) and The Holy War (Thirupporattam), to Malayalam.

Adn. Koshy was the editor of Njananikshepam (published since 1840), the first Malayalam periodical. His most important religious contribution was with respect to the revision of the Malayalam Bible (1872–1898). The Archbishop of Canterbury Edward White Benson conferred on Koshy, a Lambeth Doctorate, for his pre-eminent role in that.

== See also ==
Saint Thomas Anglicans

== Bibliography ==
- Jeffrey, Robin (1976). The Decline of Nayar Dominance: Society and Politics in Travancore, 1847-1908. Vikas Publishing House. ISBN 978-0-7069-0486-4.
- Mooken, Mar Aprem (1983). Indian Christian who is who. Bombay Parish Church of the East.
- Idiculla, Dr. Shajan A. (2012). Douthyathinte Edukal (History of CSI Central Kerala Diocese) (in Malayalam). Kottayam: CMS Press. pp. 65–66.
- Rev. C. Y. Thomas. "History of the CSI Central Kerala Diocese, Chapters 1, 2 & 3". www.csimichigan.org.
- Stock, Eugene (1899). The History of the Church Missionary Society: Its Environment, Its Men and Its Work. Vol. 4. Church Missionary Society.
- Devi, R. Leela (1978). Influence of English on Malayalam Novels. College Book House.
- George, K. M. (1972). Western Influence on Malayalam Language and Literature. Sahitya Akademi. ISBN 978-81-260-0413-3.
- Chaitanya, Krishna (1971). A History of Malayalam Literature. Orient Longman. ISBN 978-0-8046-8805-5.
