= Charles Bridges =

Charles Bridges may refer to:

- Charles Bridges (theologian) (1794–1869), preacher and theologian in the Church of England
- Charles Bridges (painter) (1672–1747), English painter active in the American colonies
- Charles Bridges (politician) (1881–1955), Australian politician
- Charles Scott Bridges (1903–1961), American corporate executive
- Charles Higbee Bridges (1873–1948), officer in the United States Army

== See also ==
- Charles Bridge, a bridge in Prague, Czech Republic
