= P. Cherian =

Travancorean high court judge

The Honourable P. Cherian
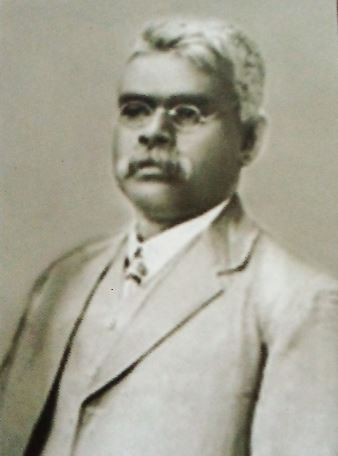

Chief Court of Cochin

High Court of Travancore

Personal details
- Born: 1867 Mavelikkara, Travancore
- Died: 1951 Tiruvalla, Travancore
- Known for: Main proponent of the Travancore Christian Succession Act of 1916

Justice Punnoose Cherian (September 1867 – 1951), was a high court judge of Travancore.

== Early life and education ==
P. Cherian was born in Mavelikkara. He was the son of Idicheriyan Punnoose, an Anglican Syrian Christian landholder.

Cherian matriculated from M. C. C. Higher Secondary School. Then, he joined Madras Christian College and earned a BA degree. In 1891, graduated in law from Madras Presidency College.

== Legal career ==
P. Cherian practiced law in Trivandrum for three years. Afterwards, he joined the Travancore government service, as a District Munsiff. After thirteen years of service as munsiff judge, he was made the District Judge of Quilon. Meanwhile, he was briefly on special duty as Settlement Officer.

After a year, he resumed his service as a Travancore district judge. Later, he was appointed to the Chief Court of Cochin, but soon returned to his original office in Travancore.

=== Travancore Christian Succession Act of 1916 ===
To address the vexed question of Christian inheritance, Dewan P. Rajagopalachari, on 23 July 1911, appointed a commission of six leading Travancore Christians to study and record evidence about the existing succession practices of Travancore Christians, with recommendations for a settled law. The commission consisted of K. C. Mammen Mappillai representing Orthodox churches, D. Francis representing the South Travancore Catholic Association, Iype Thoma Kathanar representing the Mar Thoma Church, as well as representatives from the L.M.S., Latin Catholic and Syro-Malabar Churches. District Judge P. Cherian was appointed as the President to this Commission.

Meanwhile a group of influential Saint Thomas Anglicans and reform-minded individuals from other Saint Thomas Christian denominations, came up with an idea of a legislation, comparable to the Indian Succession Act of 1865, that granted greater property rights to Syrian Christian women. Some of them were involved in a controversial lawsuit, concerning the division of property of a deceased person. This was eventually settled, based on a legal testimony of Judge P. Cherian, by applying the Indian Succession Act. The judgement was to divide the dead man's estate, equally between his mother and widow, excluding all other paternal claimants. This legal precedent, which was upheld by all higher courts, influenced the commission.

In 1912, the Christian Commission by majority, came up with a draft bill. This draft, though not as liberal as the Indian Succession Act of 1865, granted daughters who weren't given dowry, a share in ancestral property, that was equal to a third of that of a son. It also allowed widows to inherit the same share as a son, up to a maximum of one-quarter of the estate.

However, even such a moderate provision for women, was opposed by men from the patriarchal Syrian Christian community, who had a vested interest in maintaining the traditional dowry system, as it is. Iype Thoma Kathanar, despite being a Mar Thoma reformer, opposed the draft stating that a woman with independent property rights, could evade the marriage tithe payable to her Church, by opting for a civil ceremony. He alleged that the Christian Commission by majority, is manoeuvring to realize the reform ideals of its President, judge P. Cherian. He also pointed out that the division of property based on the proposed bill, could adversely affect the voting rights of those Syrian men, who were privileged enough to vote in Sree Moolam Popular Assembly elections. The only other dissenter from within the commission was K. C. Mammen Mappillai. The conservative hierarchs of various Syrian Churches were also of the same mindset and voiced their stance to the Dewan, in writing.

As a result, the draft bill was amended by a select committee of legislators from the Popular Assembly, reducing a daughter's share in ancestral property from a third to a quarter and that too subject to a maximum value of 5000 rupees. Although a widows share remained equal to that of a son's, it was made terminable upon her death or remarriage. The bill became law in 1916.

== Later years and legacy ==
Judge Cherian's efforts to create a legal framework to regulate Christian succession, did not go unnoticed. In recognition of his services, he was appointed as a judge to the high court of Travancore. Publications from that time, mentions him as an example of someone who rose to the highest judicial office of his country, purely by honesty, industriousness and merit.

The Travancore Christian Succession Act of 1916 stood for several decades as a monument of his legal acumen and judicial wisdom. Later, the Syrian Christian women of India took the cause of furthering their rights upon themselves. Educator Mary Roy, almost single-handedly fought a legal battle (dubbed Mary Roy case), challenging the discriminatory clauses in the Travancore Christian Succession Act and its Cochin counterpart. The final verdict of 1986, accorded all Syrian Christian women, equal property rights as their male siblings.

The book "The Malabar Syrians and the Church Missionary Society 1816-1840", authored by Justice P. Cherian, is considered a classic on the topic. It is frequently used and cited by researchers, who study and write on the subject.

== Bibliography ==
- Sastri, Vuppuluri Lakshminarayana (1920). Encyclopaedia of the Madras Presidency and the Adjacent States. Tamil Nadu: Oriental Encyclopaedic Publishing Company.
- Chiriyankandath, James Lazar (1985). "Part 1. Chapter 3. Communities: Social Reform and Identity". Social Change and the Development of 'modern' Politics in Travancore, from the Late Nineteenth Century to 1938. SOAS University of London.
- Shaji, Dr. A (2017). Politicisation of Caste Relations in a Princely State. Gurgaon: Zorba Books. ISBN 978-93-87456-00-6.
- Chandy, Anna (1995). A Community in Peril: Christian Women's Struggle for Equal Inheritance Rights in Kerala. Indian Social Institute.
- Macnally, Jane; Carey, William (2005). Abuse of Christian Women in India. William Carey Library. ISBN 978-0-87808-347-3.
- Neill, Stephen (2 May 2002). A History of Christianity in India: 1707-1858. Cambridge University Press. ISBN 978-0-521-89332-9.
- Cheriyan, P. (2015). The Malabar Syrians and the Church Missionary Society 1816-1840 (Second Revised Edition 2015 ed.). Kottayam: C.M.S. Press.
- Menon, K.G. Parameswara; Menon, T. K. Balakrishna (1926). "The Christian Succession Bill". The Travancore Law Journal. Vol. 6. T. K. Balakrishna Menon.
- Herklotz, Tanja; Souza, Siddharth Peter de (2021). Mutinies for Equality: Contemporary Developments in Law and Gender in India. Cambridge University Press. ISBN 978-1-108-83406-3.
