= Michael Begley (actor) =

British actor and writer

- Occupation: Actor
- Years active: 1996-

Michael Begley is a British television and theatre actor and writer.

Begley has written two stage plays: Martha Loves Michael, which was co-written with Sally Abbott, and The Guys. He wrote the television series Cowboys and Indians with Abbott and Jon Sen, and has written several episodes of EastEnders. He won Best Newcomer at the Manchester Evening News Theatre Awards in 1996 for his roles in The Tempest, Wildest Dreams and Life of Galileo, and was nominated in the TMA Awards for Best Supporting Actor in 2002. His television and film acting roles include Vacuuming Completely Nude in Paradise, Bob & Rose, City Central, William and Mary, Being Human, and most recently, an episode of EastEnders, which he also wrote.

== Filmography ==
List of television and film roles
Title	Year	Role	Note
London's Burning	1996	Teflon	1 episode
The Bill	1996, 2004, 2008	Lee Gallagher, Jonas Finch, Sammo Taylor	4 episodes
This Life	1997	Terry Cole	1 episode
McLibel!	1997	John Bruton	1 episode
The Grand	1998	Jim Craig	9 episodes
Grafters	1998	Terry	1 episode
City Central	1998–2000	PC Richard Law	31 episodes
Heartbeat	2001	Chris Draycott	1 episode
Vacuuming Completely Nude in Paradise	2001	Pete	TV film
Bob & Rose	2001	Carl Smith	
In Deep	2002	Grendel	2 episodes
The Stretford Wives	2002	Murray	TV film
The Royal	2003	Patrick Barrie	1 episode
EastEnders: Slaters in Detention	2003	PC Jim Sellers	
Dalziel and Pascoe	2005	Carl Watmough	2 episodes: "Heads You Lose"
Wire in the Blood	2005	Michael Stocks	1 episode
William and Mary	2003–05	Rick Stroud	18 episodes
Eleventh Hour	2006	Ned	1 episode
Agatha Christie's Marple: By the Pricking of My Thumbs	2006	Ethan Maxwell	TV film
Doctors	2006, 2009–10	Kieran Hartley, Henry Salisbury	11 episodes
The Last Detective	2007	Daniel Boden	1 episode
Holby City	2007, 2012	Hal Bonner, Gavin Flett	2 episodes
The Children	2008	DS Bliss	2 episodes
Silent Witness	2008	Danny Edwards	2 episodes
Minder	2009	Orson	1 episode
Being Human	2009–10	Chaplain	2 episodes
Casualty	2010	Ian Dennis	2 episodes
Doctor Who	2011, 2020	Mulligan, All Ears Allan	2 episodes: "The Curse of the Black Spot", "Fugitive of the Judoon"
Switch	2012	David	1 episode
EastEnders	2013	Mr Garner	1 episode
Vera	2019	Jason Hay	1 episode "Dirty"
