= Caste system in Kerala =

The caste system in Kerala differed from that found in the rest of India. While the Indian caste system generally modeled the four-fold division of society into Brahmins, Kshatriyas, Vaishyas and Shudras, in Kerala, the Nambudiri Brahmins formed the priestly class and only rarely recognized anyone else as being other than Shudra or untouchables, the latter being outside the caste system entirely. Thus, the Kerala caste system was ritualized but it was not the varna model found elsewhere. In Southern India, only in Kerala did there appear warrior lineages approximate to the Kshatriya model, but these warriors never lost their identity as shudras.

== Origin of the caste system ==
One theory that explains the origins of the caste system in the Kerala region – which prior to the independence of India comprised the three areas known as Malabar District, Travancore and Cochin – is based on the actions of Aryan Jains introducing such distinctions prior to the 8th century CE. This argues that the Jains needed protection when they arrived in the area and recruited a group of local sympathizers to provide it. These people were then distinguished from others in the local population by their occupation as protectors, with the others all being classed as out-caste. Cyriac Pullapilly, a Professor of History, describes that this meant they "... were given Kshatriya functions, but only Shudra status."

An alternative theory, also explained by Pullapilly, states that the system was introduced by Nambudiri Brahmins themselves. Although Brahmin influences had existed in the area since at least the 1st century CE, there was a large influx of these people from around the 8th century when they acted as priests, counsellors and ministers to invading Aryan princes. At the time of their arrival, the non-aboriginal local population had been converted to Buddhism by missionaries who had come from the north of India and from Ceylon. The Brahmins used their symbiotic relationship with the invading forces to assert their beliefs and position. Buddhist temples and monasteries were either destroyed or taken over for use in Hindu practices, thus undermining the ability of the Buddhists to propagate their beliefs. The Brahmins treated almost all of those who acceded to their priestly status as Shudra, permitting only a small number to be recognised as Kshatriya, these being some of the local rulers who co-operated with them. By the 11th century, this combination of association with kings and invaders, and with the destruction or take-over of Buddhist temples, made the Brahmins by far the largest land-owning group in the region and they remained so until very recent times. The origins of Malayalam as a language is also speculated to be Nambudiri Brahmin's mixing of Sanskrit and the local Tamil language. Their dominating influence was to be found in all matters: religion, politics, society, economics and culture.

A theory presented by Pullapilly and also by Rene Barendse, who as of 2012 is a Fellow of the International Institute for Asian Studies, claims that the caste system established by Nambudiri Brahmins of Kerala was in accordance with the will of Parasurama, an avatar of Vishnu. The Nambudiris had control of 64 villages and asserted that they had powers given to them by the gods, so much so that they considered even other Brahmin groups to be outside the caste hierarchy. Both writers consider this to be the traditional Nambudiri myth of origin. The Nambudiri Brahmins were at the top of the ritual caste hierarchy, outranking even the kings. Anyone who was not a Nambudiri was treated by them as an untouchable.

== Ritual pollution ==
The entire Malabar region had strict pollution rules that were considered by the observers to be the most extreme in all of India. Lower caste people could use only separate paths and their houses were in places where they could not be seen. Lower castes can pollute a Brahmin or Nair, not by mere touch but also coming within certain feet from them. Nair warriors could kill a lower caste Pulayar on sight if they met with one of them on the highway. The Nambudhri Brahmins were top of the caste hierarchy and the Pulayar were at the lowest. According to most travelers, the Nairs were placed below the kings and the Brahmins in Caste hierarchy. The Ambalavasis were kept between the Brahmins and the Nairs. The lower castes were known as tintal jati, i.e. castes which pollutes at a distance. The food of the upper castes were referred to as "Amruthathu" (elixir) and the food of the lower castes was called "karikadi" (black brew), similarly the, dwelling places of the higher castes and the thatched huts of the lower castes were called the "royal abode" and "the field of rubbish" respectively.

The lower castes, particularly the Pulayars were not even allowed to breathe the same air as the other castes or use a public pathway. A lower caste person could pollute a higher caste person by merely coming within a certain distance from him or in extreme cases the pollution is transmitted even by simply seeing a lower caste person. If by accident he was there and he sees an approaching Nair or a Brahmin, he must make a loud howling sound to warn the upper castes from getting near until he went away or climbed up a tree. If a Nair meets a Pulayar on the highway by accident, he cuts him down like a others cut an unpleasant animal. The Nair's right to kill any Pulayar imminently he met on the pathway is confirmed by almost all visitors to Kerala. Even the other lower castes had no communication with the Pulayar. According to Buchanan, the Nairs killed not only the Pulayars but any member of the other lower polluting castes, including the Ezhavas. Pollution rules were also observed in touching and sexual intercourse with the lower castes. Casting out the person from the caste was the punishment for disobeying the caste rules regarding pollution and in some cases sold into slavery and even death. If a Nambudhiri Brahmin woman is accused of illegitimate sexual relations, she is kept in a separate hut as her presence could pollute other members of her family before being interrogated by a caste court, the system is known as smarttivicaram. Pollution by approaching a Muslim, Christian, or a Jew is not observed but their touch is considered polluting. The custom for removing pollution is a bath by complete immersion in water.

The Nambudiris had varying rules regarding the degrees of ritual pollution while interacting with people of different castes. In return, most castes practiced the principles of untouchability in their relationship with the other regional castes. Untouchability in Kerala is not restricted to Hindus, and George Mathew says that, "Technically, the Christians were outside the caste hierarchy, but in practice, a system of inclusion and exclusion was developed ...". Among Christians, the established Saint Thomas Syrian Christians also practiced the rules of untouchability. In the colonial period, many lower castes were converted to Christianity by the European Missionaries but the new converts were not allowed to join the Syrian Christian community and they continued to be considered as untouchables even by the Syrian Christians. Syrian Christians derive status within the caste system from the tradition that they were elites, who were evangelized by Thomas the Apostle. Anand Amaladass says that "The Syrian Christians had inserted themselves within the Indian caste society for centuries and were regarded by the Hindus as a caste occupying a high place within their caste hierarchy." Syrian Christians followed the same rules of caste and pollution as that of Hindus and they were considered as pollution neutralizers. Rajendra Prasad, an Indian historian, said that the Syrian Christians took ritual baths after physical contact with lower castes .

The rules of untouchability were severe to begin with, and they were very strictly enforced among Hindu communities by the time of the arrival of the Dutch East India Company in the 17th century. Robin Jeffrey, who is a professor specialising in the modern history and politics of India, quotes the wife of a Christian missionary, who wrote in 1860 that:

... a Nair can approach but not touch a Namboodiri Brahmin: a Ezhava must remain thirty-six paces off, and a Pulayan slave ninety-six steps distant. A Ezhava must remain twelve steps away from a Nair, and a Pulayan sixty-six steps off, and a Parayan some distance farther still ... Pulayans and Parayars, who are the lowest of all, can approach but not touch, much less may they eat with each other.

Nonetheless, higher ranked communities did have some social responsibility for those perceived to be their inferiors: for example, they could demand forced labor but had to provide food for such laborers, and they had responsibilities in times of famine to provide their tenants both with food and with the seeds to grow it. There were also responsibilities to protect such people from the dangers of attack and other threats to their livelihood, and so it has been described by Barendse as "an intricate dialectic of rights and duties".

=== Ritual pollution during slavery ===
According to an estimate by Dr. Francis Buchanan in 1801 AD, 41,367 persons out of the 292,366 populations were slaves in the south, central and Northern divisions of the Malabar. In the census of 1836, 164,864 people out of the 1,280,668 were slaves in Travancore. There was an estimated 4.25 lakh slaves in Kerala during the middle of the 19th century.

The slaves belonged to the lower castes and were employed only for feudal work, and the stigma that they should be kept away from their masters was strictly followed. Samuel Mateer, noted that even in the working fields the slaves were supervised from a distance.

Based on the 1881 census an estimated 40,000 slaves converted to Islam from 1871 to 1881. Many slaves also converted to Christianity in Cochin and Travancore during this period. During the 1882 Christian Mission Conference, it was reported that the population of Muslim Mapillas were increasing rapidly due to the conversion from the lower strata of the Hindu society, and in such a phase, the entire west coast could become Muslim.

== Caste system in colonial Kerala ==
By the late 19th century, the caste system of Kerala had evolved to be the most complex to be found anywhere in India, and the exploitation of it had become considerable. Barendse explains this development:

... it turned to gross unrequited exploitation only in the nineteenth century when the British colonial pacification removed the threat of the peasant harvests being ravaged by armies or robbers and their huts being burned to the ground.

By this time there were over 500 groups represented in an elaborate structure of relationships and the concept of ritual pollution extended not merely to untouchability but even further, to un-approachability and even un-seeability. The system was gradually reformed to some degree, with one of those reformers, Swami Vivekananda, having observed that it represented a "mad house" of castes. The usual four-tier Hindu caste system, involving the varnas of Brahmin (priest), Kshatriya (warrior), Vaishya (business person, involved in trading, entrepreneurship and finance) and Shudra (service person), did not exist. Kshatriyas were rare and the only Vaishyas were not present. The roles left empty by the absence of these ritual ranks were taken to some extent by Nairs, Mappila Muslims and Syrian Christians.

== Caste in the modern era ==
The process of amelioration of caste distinctions by various social reform movements were overtaken by the events of 1947. With independence from Britain came the Indian constitution, and Article 15 of that document outlawed discrimination on the grounds of caste and race. Myron Weiner has said that the ideological basis for caste "... may be (almost, but not quite) moribund" and that:

No political parties, and no political leaders, no intellectuals support the idea that caste is part of a natural moral order based on hierarchy, ... that caste is occupationally linked and hereditary, that each caste (jati) embodies its own code of conduct (dharma), and that low-caste membership is the consequence of transgressions in one's previous life.

Weiner points out that despite the ideological demise:

... as a lived-in social reality, it is very much alive. The demise of orthodoxy, right beliefs, has not meant the demise of orthopraxy, right practice. Caste remains endogamous. Lower castes, especially members of scheduled castes, remain badly treated by those of higher castes. But the gap between beliefs and practices is the source of tension and change. The lower castes no longer accept their position in the social hierarchy, and no longer assume that their lower economic status and the lack of respect from members of the higher castes are a "given" in their social existence. But the movement for change is not a struggle to end caste; it is to use caste as an instrument for social change. Caste is not disappearing, nor is "casteism" - the political use of caste — for what is emerging in India is a social and political system which institutionalizes and transforms but does not abolish caste.

Despite being outlawed, the Indian governments – both at national and at regional level – do still recognise distinctions between the various communities but this recognition is for the purpose of positive discrimination. Throughout post-independence India, including in Kerala, there exists a framework of reservation which is fluid in nature and attempts to recognise the socio-economic disparities between various castes. Depending both on local circumstances and on the changing modern socio-economic environment, castes are classified as Forward Classes (or General), Other Backward Classes, Scheduled Castes, and the Scheduled Tribes. These classifications determine what - if any - assistance a caste community receives in any given area. Formal classification lists are compiled for the latter three groups; any community which is not listed in any of those categories is, by default, a Forward Class.

Writing in the context of violence against Dalits (untouchables) elsewhere in India, Frontline magazine said in 2006 that:

Successive governments have brought in legislation and programmes to protect the rights of Dalit communities. The safeguards enshrined in the Constitution stipulate that governments should take special care to advance the educational and economic interests of Scheduled Castes, that untouchability is unacceptable and that all Dalit communities should have unrestricted entry in Hindu temples and other religious institutions. There are political safeguards in the form of reserved seats in State legislatures and in Parliament ... But prejudices die hard.

However, Frontline goes on to note that the situation in Kerala now, is not as severe, to the extent that those seeking to research:

... continuing inequality and deprivation among traditionally disadvantaged groups in Kerala do not include Dalits any longer in their list of communities that still represent "distinct pockets of deprivation". The list includes only the traditional coastal fishing communities, the S.T.s [Scheduled Tribes] of North Kerala, and the new underclass of Tamil migrant workers ...

== Demographics ==
Around 2003, the Government of Kerala recognised 53 Scheduled Castes, 35 Scheduled Tribes and 80 Other Backwards Classes. The 2001 Census of India recognised 68 Scheduled Castes, who comprised 9.8% of the population. They were 99.9% Hindu, with a negligible number of Sikhs and Buddhists. The Census recognised 35 Scheduled Tribes, comprising 1.14% of the population and with 93.7% being Hindus. A further 5.8% were Christian, and the remainder Muslim or "not stated".

== See also ==
- Caste system among South Asian Christians
- Upper cloth revolt
- Sambandam
