= John Brydges =

John Brydges may refer to:

- John Brydges (died 1530), MP for City of London
- John Brydges, 1st Baron Chandos (1492–1557), English courtier, member of parliament and peer
- John Brydges, Marquess of Carnarvon (1703–1727), British member of parliament
- Sir John William Head Brydges (1764–1839), member of parliament for Armagh

== See also ==
- John Bridges (disambiguation)
