= Vacuuming Completely Nude in Paradise =

2001 film directed by Danny Boyle

- DVD cover art
- Directed by: Danny Boyle
- Written by: Jim Cartwright
- Produced by: Martin Carr
- Starring: Timothy Spall; Michael Begley
- Cinematography: Anthony Dod Mantle
- Edited by: Chris Gill
- Music by: John Murphy
- Production companies: BBC; Destiny Films
- Distributed by: BBC
- Release dates: 23 August 2001 (EIFF); 30 September 2001 (United Kingdom)
- Running time: 75 minutes
- Country: United Kingdom
- Language: English

Vacuuming Completely Nude in Paradise is a 2001 comedy-drama film produced by the BBC in association with Destiny Films. It was directed by Danny Boyle, written by Jim Cartwright, and stars Timothy Spall and Michael Begley. The film score was composed by John Murphy. Spall was nominated for a BAFTA award for Best Actor for his performance. A satire of door-to-door salesmen, the promotional material described the film as a cross between Death of a Salesman and Glengarry Glen Ross. The film was created in the aftermath of the lackluster performances of Boyle's preceding films, A Life Less Ordinary and The Beach. Vacuuming Completely Nude in Paradise was a smaller budget and a return to more successful stylings and themes.

The film premiered at the Edinburgh International Film Festival on 23 August 2001 on a double-bill with its companion project Strumpet. The double-bill was screened again at the Toronto International Film Festival on 14 September 2001. Vacuuming Completely Nude in Paradise was broadcast on BBC Two on 30 September 2001.

== Plot ==
Pete, a struggling electronic music DJ, plays music accompanying his girlfriend Sheila while she performs a stripogram at a retirement party for 'Throat', an elderly vacuum salesman who dies during the party. Pete is offered a job as a replacement for 'Throat. Pete is paired with Tommy Rag, an aggressive high-performing salesman

Sheila tells Pete that she will not have sex with him anymore until he makes his first sale. The next morning, Pete asks Tommy if he can make a sale on his own and Pete drops him off in a poor neighborhood and warns him to leave quickly after making the sale. He sells a vacuum to a single mother of four who continuously laments all of her troubles. Sheila welcomes him home in a leather catsuit, eager for sex, but Pete is so wracked with guilt that he returns to the poor woman's home, takes back the vacuum, tears up her contract and gives her some money. While he is leaving he is beaten and robbed of the vacuum by three young men. He apologises to Sheila, who calls him a loser.

Sheila leaves Pete and he becomes desperate to get information on her whereabouts. He goes to ask an elderly neighbour, only to find her corpse among stacks of old newspapers. In surprise, he topples a candle lighting them on fire. While extinguishing the newspapers, Tommy is waiting outside impatiently. While waiting on hold for the police, Tommy tells Pete of a dream he had about Uki, the new Head of IT, transforming the office into a sales call centre operated by intelligent women gently guiding customers toward the sale instead of the aggressive sales approaches he currently knows and admits to hating. In the dream he follows her into a computer screen leading to a tropical beach. She is gone but there is a gold vacuum on the beach and he begins vacuuming completely nude in Paradise, weeping tears of joy.

At the next house, Tommy goes upstairs to have sex with the potential customer, whom he has nicknamed 'Spaniard', while Pete has sex with her lonely mentally handicapped daughter. Tommy successfully closes the sale but Pete once again feels guilty about the experience. They pick up a hitchhiker, a DJ who calls himself 'De Kid'. Pete asks him questions about how he got started and asks him to listen to his mixtape. De Kid takes the tape and promises to play it at his show that night, then tells Pete the secret that 'silence is loud'. Tommy drops off the final sales contracts at the office as Pete falls asleep and dreams about life as a successful DJ. He awakens to find 'Spaniard' and her daughter in the car as Tommy is driving them to the prize ceremony at Metropole Hotel in Blackpool, predicting himself the winner.

At the prize ceremony, Uki announces 'Pockmark' as the winner of the Golden Vac award. Tommy ties with the deceased 'Throat' for second place. Enraged, Tommy barges into the ladies' restroom and demands answers from 'Stonecheeks'. She admits to him that this will be the last competition and that Uki, who she jealously reveals is in an intimate relationship with the boss, will be working to focus more on Internet sales, eliminating many of the jobs for salesmen. She tells Tommy that he was one sale short of 'Pockmark' and that he tied with 'Throat' because the boss convinced the other salesmen to donate some of their sales to the 'Throat Memorial'. Meanwhile, Pete sees that De Kid is working as the DJ at the party and that his own mixtape is getting the crowd dancing. Tommy suddenly pulls the plugs on the DJ equipment and angrily begins choking Pete, whom he blames for the loss, but is stopped by the mentally handicapped girl lashing him with a whip to protect Pete. Tommy is sacked and kicked out on the street. Peter is given a chance to work the DJ equipment to the adulation of the crowd as Tommy angrily storms toward the sea, discarding his clothing and ultimately throwing a vacuum into the tide before he collapses. 'Spaniard' chases after him and finds his dead body on the beach.

== Cast ==
- Timothy Spall as Tommy Rag
- Michael Begley as Pete
- Katy Cavanagh as Sheila
- Caroline Ashley as Uki
- Alice Barry as Lorna
- Terry Barry as Ted
- Julie Brown as Receptionist
- James Cartwright as De Kid
- Lorraine Cheshire as Hot Pot
- Keith Clifford as Sidney
- David Crellin as Mr Ron
- James Foster as Porter
- Sandra Gough as Spaniard
- Marvin Henriques as Tony
- Renny Krupinski as Pockmark
- Rodney Litchfield as Throat
- Gareth Miller as Mugger
- Caroline Pegg as Boney Lyn
- Maggie Tagney as Stonecheeks
- Miriam Watkins as Claywoman
- Jonathan Bridge as Bespectacled Man at Party (uncredited)
- Jason Croot as Gangster (uncredited)
