= Thomas Bridges =

Thomas Bridges may refer to:

- Thomas Bridges (dramatist and parodist) (c. 1710–c. 1775), English writer of parodies
- Thomas Bridges (botanist) (1807–1865), English botanist and traveling specimen collector
- Thomas Bridges (missionary) (1842–1898), Anglican missionary and linguist
- Thomas Bridges (Australian politician) (1853–1939), member of the Queensland Legislative Assembly
- Thomas Bridges, 2nd Baron Bridges (1927–2017), British diplomat
- Thomas Edward Bridges (1783–1843), Oxford college head
- Tom Bridges (1871–1939), British military officer and governor of South Australia
- Tommy Bridges (1906–1968), American baseball player
- Sir Thomas Pym Bridges, 7th Baronet (1805–1895), of the Bridges baronets

== See also ==
- Bridges (disambiguation)
