= Emory E. Bridges =

American politician

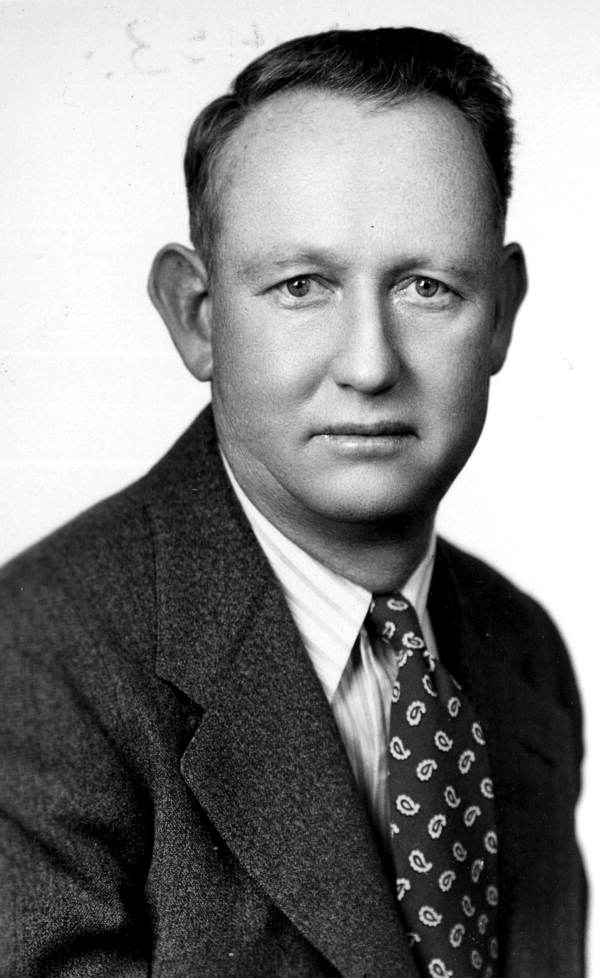
- Bridges in 1949

Member of the Florida House of Representatives from Calhoun County
- In office 1949

Personal details
- Born: November 24, 1905 Sylvester, Georgia, U.S.
- Died: September 9, 1997 (aged 91)
- Party: Democratic

Emory E. Bridges (November 24, 1905 – September 9, 1997) was an American politician. He served as a Democratic member of the Florida House of Representatives.

== Life and career ==
Bridges was born in Sylvester, Georgia.

Bridges served in the Florida House of Representatives in 1949.

Bridges died on September 9, 1997, at the age of 91.
