= Alexander Bridges =

English footballer

Personal information
- Place of birth: England
- Position: Outside left

Senior career*
Years	Team	Apps	(Gls)
1932	Blackpool	7	(0)
- * Club domestic league appearances and goals

Alexander Bridges was an English professional footballer. An outside left, his only known club was Blackpool, for whom he made seven Football League appearances in 1932.
