= Charles Scott Bridges =

American corporate executive

Charles Scott Bridges (April 24, 1903 – November 24, 1961) was an American corporate executive.

== Early life and education ==
Bridges was born at Bridges P.O., Gloucester County, Virginia. He was the youngest of fourteen children (eleven of whom grew to adulthood), born to Thomas Francis Bridges, a farmer, merchant, and postmaster, and his wife Mary Otie Bartow (Hughes) Bridges. His paternal grandparents were John Alexander Bridges, M.D. and Florida (Stubblefield) Bridges.

His earliest known ancestor in Gloucester, Simon Stubblefield, had received a land grant there in 1688. After Bridges' father suffered a stroke in 1912, the family moved to the city of Norfolk, where Bridges completed elementary school and Maury High School. In 1922, after completing high school, Bridges shipped out as an apprentice seaman on a tramp ship, the S.S. Schroon, and for the first time saw the Caribbean and the Mediterranean, which he said later decided him on a career in international business.

Returning to Virginia, he attended the University of Virginia for a year, worked for a year for a food brokerage concern, and then in 1924 became a salesman in Norfolk for Libby, McNeill & Libby, one of the largest American producers of canned foods. He was to spend the remainder of his life in the employ of Libby's.

== Career ==
In 1927 Bridges was transferred to Libby's export department and assigned to the company's office in New Orleans. With New Orleans as a base, he spent the next four years selling Libby's products in the Caribbean and Central and South America. In 1932 he was assigned to Libby's corporate headquarters in Chicago. In 1938 he was named manager of the export department, and in 1943 he became corporate vice president for sales and advertising. He was made a director of the company in 1947, and in 1953 he became Libby's President and Chief Executive Officer. Libby's expanded and modernized during his presidency, and he successfully fought off an attempt by outsiders to take over the company. By 1960 Libby's had 9,000 employees and annual revenues of $296 million, and ranked 154th in size among U.S. corporations.

Bridges served as an officer of the Grocery Manufacturers of America, a trustee of the National Nutrition Foundation, and a member of the boards of the Chicago Chamber of Commerce, the Council on Medical and Biological Research of the University of Chicago, and Community Memorial General Hospital of La Grange, Illinois. He was a member of the Society of the Cincinnati in the State of Virginia and the Sons of the American Revolution.

== Personal life ==
Charles Scott Bridges was married in New Orleans on August 26, 1931, to Shirley Amalie Devlin, a native of that city, who survived him until 2003. They had three children: Ambassador Peter Scott (1932- 2022 ), who married Mary Jane Lee; Shirley Bartow Ann (1936- ), who married Peter Joseph Pizzo, Jr.; and Mary Elizabeth (1947- ), who married Timothy Wiggenhorn, from whom she was subsequently divorced. As of 2025, Charles Scott and Shirley (Devlin) Bridges were also survived by eleven grandchildren and fifteen great-grandchildren.

== Legacy ==
Bridges died at his home in Hinsdale, Illinois, on November 24, 1961. Subsequently, Libby's was acquired by Nestlé, which continued to use Libby's as a brand name for some years. In recent years, Seneca Foods has licensed the Libby's name.
