= Jonathan Bridge =

English actor (born 1966)

Jonathan Bridge (born 1966 in Manchester) is an English actor.

== Selected filmography ==
- Brassed Off (1996)
- The Navigators (2001)
- Vacuuming Completely Nude in Paradise (2001)
- Asylum (2005)
- Sherlock Holmes (2009)
- The Road to Coronation Street (TV) (2010)
- Job Culture (also writer and director) (2011)
- '71 (2014)
- Reg TV Movie (2016)
- The Witness for the prosecution TV Mini Series (2016)
