= Candice Bridge =

American chemist and researcher

Candice Mae Bridge
- Education: University of Central Florida; Howard University
- Scientific career
- Workplaces: United States Army; Howard University; University of Central Florida
- Thesis: Discrimination of forensic trace evidence using laser induced breakdown spectroscopy (2007)

Candice Mae Bridge is an American chemist and associate professor of chemistry and forensic science at the University of Central Florida. Her research considers the development of mass spectrometry for forensic analysis, including the characterization of lubricant from rape victims and residue from gunshots, as well as the identification of drugs in urine samples.

== Early life and education ==
Bridge is from Brooklyn, New York. She was encouraged by her high school guidance counselor to study chemistry at university. Bridge earned her bachelor's degree in chemistry and applied mathematics at Howard University, where she worked in the laboratory of Folahan Ayorinde. She moved to the University of Central Florida for her graduate studies, where she worked alongside Michael Sigman on the development of laser-induced breakdown spectroscopy (LIBS) for forensic analysis. Before the work of Bridge, forensic analysis was conducted using scanning electron microscopy energy-dispersive X-ray spectroscopy (EDX), which is a time consuming analytical tool that is impractical for high throughout analysis. On the other hand, LIBS offers the opportunity for elemental analysis based on the emissions of the ionic, atomic and diatomic molecular components. As part of her doctoral research, Bridge developed statistical methods that allowed analysis of known and unknown samples. She was one of the first people with a doctoral degree in forensic science in the United States. After earning her doctorate, Bridge remained at the University of Central Florida College of Optics and Photonics where she continued to study LIBS and developed sophisticated analytical techniques. In 2008 Bridge joined Howard University as a lecturer of chemistry, and was voted Professor of the Year.

== Research and career ==
After a year at Howard University, Bridge joined the United States Army Defense Forensic Science Center (DFSC) (formerly known as the U.S. Army Criminal Investigation Laboratory). She held various positions at the DFSC and was responsible for the examination of trace evidence. She originally worked in Atlanta, Georgia, where she performed forensic investigations into fire debris. She was eventually promoted to the Office of the Chief Scientist, where she oversaw human research projects.

In 2014 Bridge was appointed an assistant professor at the University of Central Florida, where she is also part of the National Center for Forensic Science. She was the only Black tenure-track faculty member in the UCF Department of Chemistry. At UCF she developed mass spectrometry, gas chromatography and fourier-transform infrared spectroscopy for use in sexual assault investigations. Bridge proposed that forensic scientists should investigate the lubricant and cosmetic particles left behind at the scene of a crime. In particular, she studies the evidence that is left behind on condoms. In 2016 she was awarded a research grant from the National Institute of Justice to study rape investigation methods in collaboration with the Federal Bureau of Investigation. To assist with rape investigations, Bridge developed the Sexual Lubricant Database, a compilation of data on the identifying characteristics and chemical composition of sexual lubricants. This database allows forensic scientists to analyze the ingredients found in sexual lubricants to identify their molecular signatures specific to certain brands and formulations. These unique elements allow investigators of sexual assaults to potentially identify lubricant evidence left at a crime scene and narrow the suspect pool to individuals who have that product or connect the crimes of a serial offender. For example, a lubricant that contains pulegone will give the product a raspberry scent, allowing investigators to associate trace evidence from a crime scene that smells like raspberries to a specific lubricant.

== Awards and honors ==
- 2009 Professor of the Year, Howard University Chemistry Department
- 2014 United States Army Commanders Award for Civilian Service
- 2016 UCF Woman Making History
- 2017 Essence magazine Young Phenom

== Selected publications ==
- Bridge, Candice M.; Powell, Joseph; Steele, Katie L.; Sigman, Michael E. (2007-12-01). "Forensic comparative glass analysis by laser-induced breakdown spectroscopy". Spectrochimica Acta Part B: Atomic Spectroscopy. A Collection of Papers Presented at the 4th International Conference on Laser Induced Plasma Spectroscopy and Applications (LIBS 2006). 62 (12): 1419–1425. Bibcode:2007AcSpB..62.1419B. doi:10.1016/j.sab.2007.10.015. ISSN 0584-8547.
- Sisco, Edward; Dake, Jeffrey; Bridge, Candice (2013-10-10). "Screening for trace explosives by AccuTOF™-DART®: An in-depth validation study". Forensic Science International. 232 (1): 160–168. doi:10.1016/j.forsciint.2013.07.006. ISSN 0379-0738. PMID 24053876.
- Bridge, Candice M.; Powell, Joseph; Steele, Katie L.; Williams, Mary; MacInnis, Jean M.; Sigman, Michael E. (2006-10-01). "Characterization of Automobile Float Glass with Laser-Induced Breakdown Spectroscopy and Laser Ablation Inductively Coupled Plasma Mass Spectrometry". Applied Spectroscopy. 60 (10): 1181–1187. Bibcode:2006ApSpe..60.1181B. doi:10.1366/000370206778664572. PMID 17059671. S2CID 19902923.
- Marić, Mark; Bridge, Candice (2016). "Characterizing and Classifying Water-Based Lubricants using Direct Analysis in Real Time® – Time of Flight Mass Spectrometry". Forensic Science International. 266: 73–79. doi:10.1016/j.forsciint.2016.04.036. PMID 27235592 – via Elsevier Science Direct.
