= John Bridges =

John Bridges may refer to:

- John Bridges (bishop) (1536–1618), Bishop of Oxford
- John Bridges (Parliamentarian) (1610–?), English politician who sat in the House of Commons in 1654 and 1656
- John Bridges (topographer) (1666–1724), English lawyer, antiquarian and topographer
- John Bridges (archer) (1852–1925), British archer who competed at the 1908 Summer Olympics
- John Bridges (software developer), author of GLPro, GRASP, and PCPaint
- John Keith Bridges (born 1952), rugby league player for Featherstone Rovers, England and Great Britain
- John Bridges (MP) (died 1537), MP for Canterbury
- John E. Bridges, Chelan County Superior Court Judge in Washington state

== See also ==
- John Brydges (disambiguation)
