= Mark Bridges =

Mark Bridges may refer to:

- Mark Bridges, 3rd Baron Bridges (born 1954), solicitor to members of the British royal family
- Mark Bridges (costume designer), American costume designer

== See also ==
- Mark Bridge (born 1985), Australian soccer player
