= Charles Bridges (theologian) =

Church of England preacher and theologian (1794–1869)

Charles Bridges (24 March 1794 – 2 April 1869) was an Anglican preacher and theologian, and a leader of that denomination's Evangelical Party. As a preacher he was well regarded by his contemporaries, but is remembered today for his literary contributions.

== Education and ministry ==
Educated at Queens' College, Cambridge, he was ordained in 1817 and served from 1823 to 1849 as vicar of Old Newton, Suffolk. Thomas Chalmers wrote,

My excellent friend, the Rev. Charles Bridges, of Old Newton, Suffolk, finds, I am sure, most ample occupation among those six hundred people whom he may be said to have domesticated into one parochial family; and, were it not for his still more important services to the Christian church at large, would show, by his incessant labours, how possible it were to make out a most beneficial expenditure of all his strength and all his time amongst them.

In 1849, he became vicar of Weymouth, Dorset, later serving as vicar of Hinton Martell, Dorset (c. 1857). Bridges participated (with J. C. Ryle) in the Clerical Conference at Weston-super-Mare of 1858, and also participated in the consecration of the Bishop of Carlisle in York Minster in 1860.

== Personal life ==
Bridges was married to Harriet Torlesse, with whom he had at least two sons, the second of whom was physician John Henry Bridges, BA BM Oxon FRCP (1832–1906).

== Literary works ==
At least twenty-four editions of Bridges' Exposition of Psalm 119 (1827) were published in his lifetime. C. H. Spurgeon considered the commentary to be "worth its weight in gold". Spurgeon also pronounced Bridges' Exposition of Proverbs (1840) "The best work on the Proverbs".

== Bibliography ==
- Exposition of Psalm 119 (1827)
- The Christian Ministry (1829)
- Memoir of Mary Jane Graham (c. 1834)
- Forty-eight Scriptural Studies (1837)
- Exposition of Proverbs (1840)
- A Manual for the Young (1849)
- Exposition of Ecclesiastes (1860)
- Correspondence (posthumous, 1870)
