= S. N. Sadasivan =

Indian author and administrator (1926–2006)

- Born: 28 May 1926; Mavelikkara, Alappuzha, Kerala, India
- Died: Mysore
- Occupations: Business trainer, author

Sivanandamandiram Narayanan Sadasivan (1926–2006) was an Indian author. Sadasivan wrote various books on public administration, the social history of India and management. He managed the activities of the Kerala Institute of Public Administration at Thiruvananthapuram, Kerala.

== Career ==
For 14 years from 1964, Sadasivan worked for the Government of India as a teacher of Indian Civil Service trainees in various institutes across India. He was a professor of Public Administration in the Kerala Institute Public administration in Thiruvananthapuram from 1978 to 1980. He served as a professor of public administration in the Indian Institute of Public Administration, New Delhi, and then in the Academy of Administration, Bhopal from 1988 to 1993.

== Published works ==
- Party and democracy in India, Tata McGraw-Hill: New Delhi (1977) – a revision of Sadasivan's thesis submitted to the University of Poona in 1963
- District administration: A national perspective, Indian Institute of Public Administration: New Delhi (1988) – editor
- Dynamics of public policy, Indian Journal of Public Administration. Vol. 31, no. 4 (Oct.-Dec. 1985))
- District administration: A national perspective : National seminar on district administration : Selected papers and summaries, Indian Institute of Public Administration: New Delhi (1988) – co-authored with Indian Institute of Public Administration
- Citizen and administration, Indian Institute of Public Administration: New Delhi (1984)
- Productivity and efficiency in administration, Phoenix Publishing House: New Delhi (2002)
- Administration and social development in Kerala : a study in administrative sociology, Indian Institute of Public Administration: New Delhi (1988)
- Aspects of Kerala's administration, Indian Institute of Public Administration: Trivandrum (1980) – editor
- Political and administrative integration of princely states – With special reference to Kerala State, India, Mittal Publications (2005)
- River disputes in India: Kerala rivers under siege, Mittal Publications: New Delhi (2005)
- A Social History of India, A.P.H. Publishing: New Delhi (2000) This book analyses Indian history from the standpoint of the former religious face of India, the Buddhism and shatters the beliefs and myths propagated by Brahmanic institutions. His views on Pulayanarkotta has been mentioned in The Hindu His opinions on various historical aspects, such caste systems, have been debated and cited.
- Case studies in public administration, Trivandrum Kerala Regional Branch Indian Institute of Public Administration (1983)

Sadasivan also co authored/written chapters of few books on public administration.

== Death ==
Sadasivan died of cancer in 2006.
