= Robin Jeffrey =

Canadian-born professor

Robin Bannerman Jeffrey FASSA FAHA is a Canadian-born professor. His primary research interest is the modern history and politics of India, especially with reference the northern area of Punjab and Kerala in the south. He is also interested in Indian media studies and development studies.

== Life ==
Robin Jeffrey was born in Canada. He studied first at the University of Victoria, British Columbia, Canada, from where he graduated with a BA degree. He was awarded a D.Phil. in modern Indian history by the University of Sussex, England, in 1973 and had previously worked as a school teacher in Chandigarh, India, for the Regional Institute of English and the Canadian University Service Overseas between 1967 and 1969. His first employment had been in 1963 as a sports writer for a small daily newspaper in Canada.

Jeffrey took up a position as a research fellow at the Australian National University upon completion of his doctorate. He has taught at that institution in Canberra during two different periods. He taught politics at La Trobe University, Melbourne, Australia, between 1979 and 2005, where he became a professor. In 2002, he was elected a Fellow of the Australian Academy of Social Sciences, having been previously elected a Fellow of the Australian Academy of the Humanities in 1994.

As of 2018, Jeffrey is an Emeritus Professor of La Trobe University and the Australian National University. He chairs an advisory panel of the Australia India Institute within the University of Melbourne, Australia. He was a visiting research professor at the Institute of South Asian Studies, based at the National University of Singapore, since 2009.

In 2011, when concentrating on media and development studies, Jeffrey said that

The mobile phone is the most disruptive individual device since shoes. Shoes gave people who owned them the ability to do things they could not do before and that people without shoes could not do. If you want to control people and make them inferior, take away their shoes.

== Publications ==
Jeffrey's published works include:

=== Author ===
- The Decline of Nayar Dominance: Society and Politics in Travancore, 1847–1908. University of Sussex Press. 1976. OCLC 472829914. – his DPhil thesis
- People, princes, and paramount power: society and politics in the Indian princely states. Oxford University Press. 1978.
- What's happening to India?: Punjab, ethnic conflict, Mrs. Gandhi's death, and the test for federalism. Macmillan. 1986. ISBN 9780333427231.
- Politics, Women and Well-Being: How Kerala Became a "Model". Macmillan. 1992. ISBN 9780333548080.
- India's Newspaper Revolution: Capitalism, Politics and the Indian-Language Press, 1977-99. London: C. Hurst & Co. 2000. ISBN 9781850654346.
- Mission, Money and Machinery: Indian Newspapers in the Twentieth Century. Institute of South Asian Studies. 2010.
- The Great Indian Phone Book. London: C. Hurst; New York: Harvard University Press. 2013. ISBN 9780674072688. (co-authored with Assa Doron and published by Hatchette in India as Cell Phone Nation)
- Waste of a Nation: Garbage and Growth in India. Cambridge, MA: Harvard University Press, 2018 (co-authored with Assa Doron).

=== Editor ===
- Media and Work in China and India (co-editor with Ronojoy Sen)
- More Than Maoism: Politics, Policies, and Insurgencies in South Asia. Manohar Publications. 2012. ISBN 9788173049330. (with Ronojoy Sen and Pratima Singh)
- Diminishing Conflict in Asia and the Pacific. Routledge. 2012. ISBN 9780415670319. (with Edward Aspinall and Anthony Regan)
- Being Muslim in South Asia. Oxford University Press. 2013. (co-editor with Ronojoy Sen)
- Asia, the winning of independence. Macmillan. 1981. ISBN 9780333278567.

== See also ==
- ANU Research School of Pacific and Asian Studies
