= Christianity in India =

Christians in India
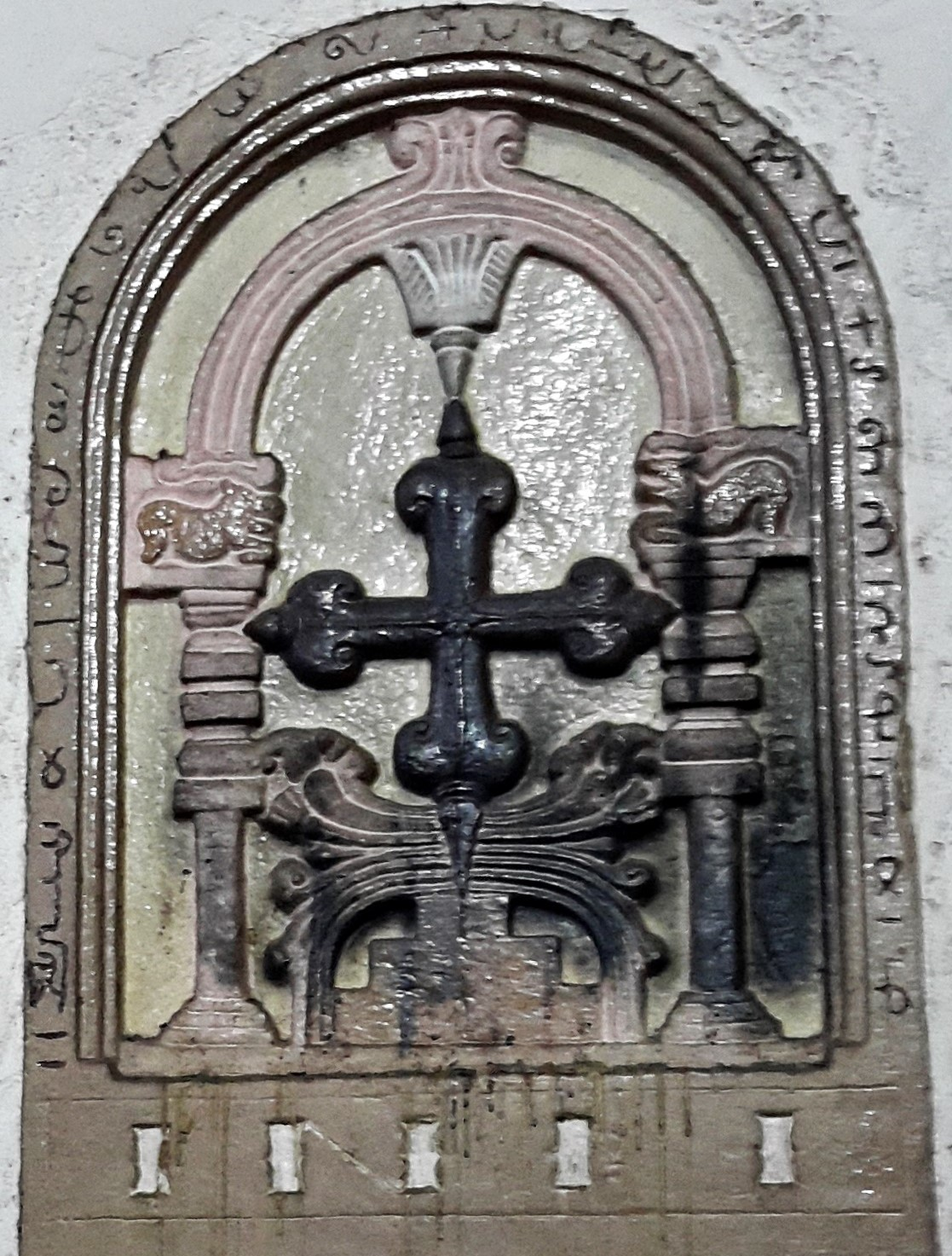
- Saint Thomas Christian cross from the 9th-century St George's Church, Kadamattom, Kerala

Total population
- 27,819,588 (2.3%) (2011)

Regions with significant populations
- Kerala: 6,141,269
- Tamil Nadu: 4,418,331
- Meghalaya: 2,213,027
- Nagaland: 1,739,651
- Jharkhand: 1,418,608
- Manipur: 1,179,043
- Assam: 1,165,867
- Odisha: 1,161,708
- Karnataka: 1,142,647
- Andhra Pradesh: 1,129,784

Religions
- Protestant (59.22%), Roman Catholic (33.19%), Oriental Orthodox (7.44%), others (0.15%) etc.

Languages
- Malayalam, Aramaic, Syriac, Suriyani Malayalam, Latin, English, Tamil, Bengali, Punjabi,, Hindi-Urdu, Bodo, Khasi, Karbi, Rabha, Mushing, Naga, Mizo, Kuki, Garo, Hmar, Nepali, Assamese, Odia, Gujarati, Marathi, Kokborok, Konkani, Kadodi, Kannada, Telugu, Bombay East Indian dialect & other Indian languages
- Names in native languages include Nasrani, Kristhava, Isai & Masihi-Qaum

India has one of the oldest continuous Christian traditions in the world dating back to 52 AD. Christianity is India's third-largest religion with 28 million adherents, who make up 2.3 percent of the population, according to the 2011 census. Kerala has the largest Christian population in India. Nearly two-thirds (65 percent) of India's Christians are found in South India, Goa and Mumbai (Bombay). Christianity is the major religion in parts of Northeast India, specifically in Nagaland, Mizoram and Meghalaya. Christians are also a significant plurality in Manipur.

The written records of St Thomas Christians mention that Christianity was introduced to the Indian subcontinent by Thomas the Apostle, who sailed to the Malabar region (present-day Kerala) in 52 AD. The writings of Eusebius of Caesarea and of Jerome record that Bartholomew the Apostle evangelised India, particularly in the Konkan. The Acts of Thomas say that the early Christians were Malabar Jews who had settled in what is present-day Kerala before the birth of Christ. St Thomas, an Aramaic-speaking Jew from Galilee (present-day Israel) and one of the disciples of Jesus Christ, came to India in search of Indian Jews. After years of evangelism, Thomas was martyred and then buried at St Thomas Mount, in the Mylapore neighbourhood of Madras (Chennai). Ambrose of Milan, in his commentary on the Psalms, noted that Thomas the Apostle preached the Gospel to the Indian people. There is the scholarly consensus that a Christian community, had firmly established in the Malabar region by 600 AD at the latest; the community was composed of Nestorians or Eastern Christians, who belonged to the Church of the East and used the East Syriac Rite of worship.

Following the discovery of the sea route to India, by the Portuguese explorer Vasco da Gama in the 15th century AD, Western Christianity was established in the European colonies of Goa, Tranquebar, Bombay, Madras and Pondicherry; as in Catholicism (of Latin or Syriac Rites) and various kinds of Protestantism. The Church of North India and the Church of South India are a United Protestant denomination; which resulted from the evangelism/ ecumenism of Anglicans, Calvinists, Methodists and other Protestant groups who flourished in colonial India. Consequently, these churches are part of the worldwide Anglican Communion, World Communion of Reformed Churches, and World Methodist Council. Christian missionaries introduced the western educational system to the Indian subcontinent, to preach Christianity and to campaign for Hindu social reforms like the Channar revolt. The oldest known Christian group in North India are the Hindustani-speaking Bettiah Christians of Bihar, formed in the early 1700s through a Capuchin mission and under the patronage of the Bettiah Rajas during the Moghal Empire. Along with native Christians, small numbers of mixed Eurasian peoples, such as Anglo-Indian, Luso-Indian, Franco-Indian and Armenian Indian Christians also existed. Also, there is the Hindu Khrista Bhakta movement, who are unbaptised followers of Jesus Christ and St Mary, mainly among Shudras and Dalits.

Christians were involved in the Indian National Congress (INC), which led the Indian independence movement, the All India Conference of Indian Christians advocated for swaraj (self rule) and opposed the partition of India. There are reports of crypto-Christians who keep their faith in secret or hiding, due to the fear of persecution; especially Dalit (Outcaste) or Adivasi (Aboriginal) Christians resort to crypsis, because reservation and other rights are denied on conversion. Some Christians have gone through reconversion to Hinduism by Hindu extremists, such as Shiv Sena (SS), the Vishva Hindu Parishad (VHP) and the Bharatiya Janata Party (BJP). Various groups of Hindu extremists have also attacked churches, or disrupted church services in certain states and territories of India. Convent schools and charities are being targeted under the Modi administration, particularly by banning missionaries from getting donations from abroad, while anti-Christian and pro-hindutva groups have been raising foreign funds.

== Ancient period ==
=== Apostolic age ===
==== Saint Thomas ====
Roman trade with India originated in Ancient Egypt according to the Periplus of the Erythraean Sea (1st century).

According to the traditional account of Saint Thomas Christians, Thomas the Apostle came to Kodungallur (Cranganore) in the present day Kerala in 52 AD, and established the Ezharappallikal (Seven Churches) in or near ancient Jewish colonies by preaching among local Jews and Brahmins. According to St Thomas Christian tradition, Thomas the Apostle did the first baptism in India at St Thomas Syro-Malabar Church, Palayur, this church is therefore considered an Apostolic See credited to the apostolate of Thomas. After some years of evangelisation in South India, Thomas was martyred at the St Thomas Mount in Chennai (Madras) in 72 AD. The neo-Gothic Cathedral Basilica of San Thome now stands on the site of his martyrdom and burial. A historically more likely claim by Eusebius of Caesarea is that Pantaenus, the head of the Christian exegetical school in Alexandria, Egypt went to India in 190 AD and found Christians already living in India using a version of the Gospel of Matthew with "Hebrew letters, a mixture of culture". This is a plausible reference to the earliest Indian churches which are known to have used the Syriac New Testament; Syriac being a dialect of the Aramaic language spoken by Jesus and his disciples. Pantaenus's evidence thus indicates that early Christians from the Middle East had already evangelised parts of India by the late 2nd century AD.

Another Christian tradition concerning the birth of Jesus holds that Gaspar, one of the three Biblical Magi, travelled from India to find the infant Jesus along with Melchior of Persia and Balthazar of Arabia.

An early 3rd-century AD Syriac work known as the Acts of Thomas connects the tradition of the Apostle Thomas's Indian ministry with two kings, one in the north and the other in the south. The year of his arrival is widely disputed due to lack of credible records. According to one of the legends in the Acts of Thomas, Thomas was at first reluctant to accept this mission, but Jesus over-ruled him by ordering circumstances so compelling that he was forced to accompany an Indian merchant, Abbanes, to his native place in northwest India, where he found himself in the service of the Indo-Parthian king, Gondophares. The apostle's ministry reputedly resulted in many conversions throughout this northern kingdom, including the king and his brother.

The Acts of Thomas identifies his second mission in India with a kingdom ruled by a certain King named Mahadwa belonging to a 1st-century dynasty in southern India. Niranam Pally, also known as St Mary's Orthodox Syrian Church, is believed to be one of the oldest churches in India. The church was founded by St Thomas in 54 AD. On his way from Kollam (Quilon) in the northeast direction, he arrived at Niranam "Thrikpapaleswaram" by sea. The church was reconstructed several times with some parts dating back to a reconstruction in 1259. The architecture of the church bears a striking similarity to Hindu temple architecture.

==== Saint Bartholomew ====
Eusebius of Caesarea's Ecclesiastical History (5:10) states that Bartholomew, a disciple of Jesus, went on a missionary tour to India, where he left behind a copy of the Gospel of Matthew. One tradition holds that he preached the Gospel in India, prior to his travels to Armenia, while others hold that Bartholomew travelled as a missionary in Ethiopia, Mesopotamia, Parthia, and Lycaonia. The writings of Eusebius of Caesarea and Jerome record that Bartholomew the Apostle evangelized in ancient India.

=== Later antiquity ===
Although little is known of the immediate growth of the church in the northwestern regions of India, Bardaisan (154–223 AD) reports that in his time there were Christian tribes in North India that claimed to have been converted by Thomas and had books and relics to prove it. It is believed that by the time of the establishment of the Sassanid Empire around 226 AD, there were bishops of the Church of the East in northwest India, Afghanistan and Baluchistan, with laymen and clergy alike engaging in missionary activity. The Syriac Chronicle of Edessa describes a "church of the Christians" in India around 200 AD.

India had a flourishing trade with Central Asia, the Mediterranean, and the Middle East, both along mountain passes in the north and sea routes down the western and southern coast, well before the advent of the Christian era, and it is likely that Christian merchants from these lands settled in Indian cities along these trading routes. The colony of Syrian Christians established at Muziris may be the first Christian community in South India for which there is a continuous written record.

The Chronicle of Seert describes an evangelical mission to India by Bishop David of Basra around the year 300, who reportedly made many conversions, and it has been speculated that his mission took in areas of southern India.

From various records of travelers we know the existence of Christian communities in India already by the year 345.

Thomas of Cana, a Syriac Christian merchant, brought a group of 72 Christian families from Mesopotamia to Kerala in the 4th century. He was granted copper-plates by the Chera dynasty, which gave his party and all native Christians socio-economic privileges. The group of Christians that came along with Thomas of Cana (Knai Thoma) are called Knanaya Christians.

The existence of Early Christians in India is further substantiated by the records acknowledging the work of Severus of Vienne, a 5th-century missionary of Indian origin who evangelised in Vienne, France.

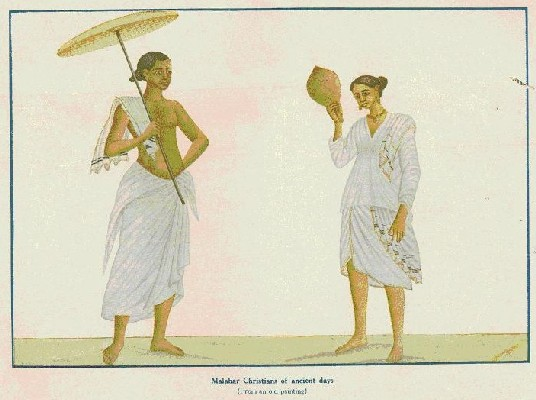
Saint Thomas Christians or Syrian Christians of ancient days from an old painting

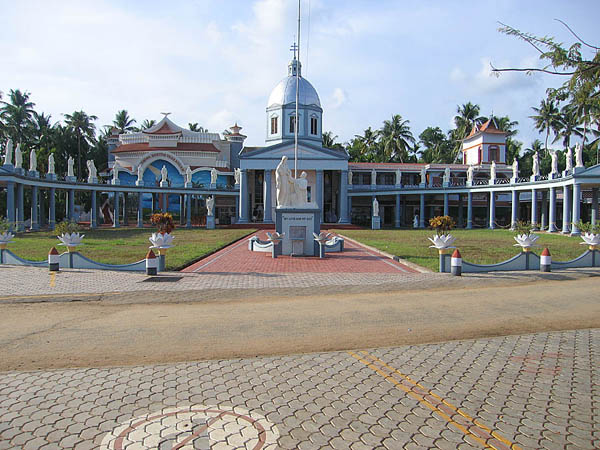
Mar Thoma Syro-Malabar Catholic Church, at Muziris, is believed to be the first Christian church built in India, circa 52 AD.

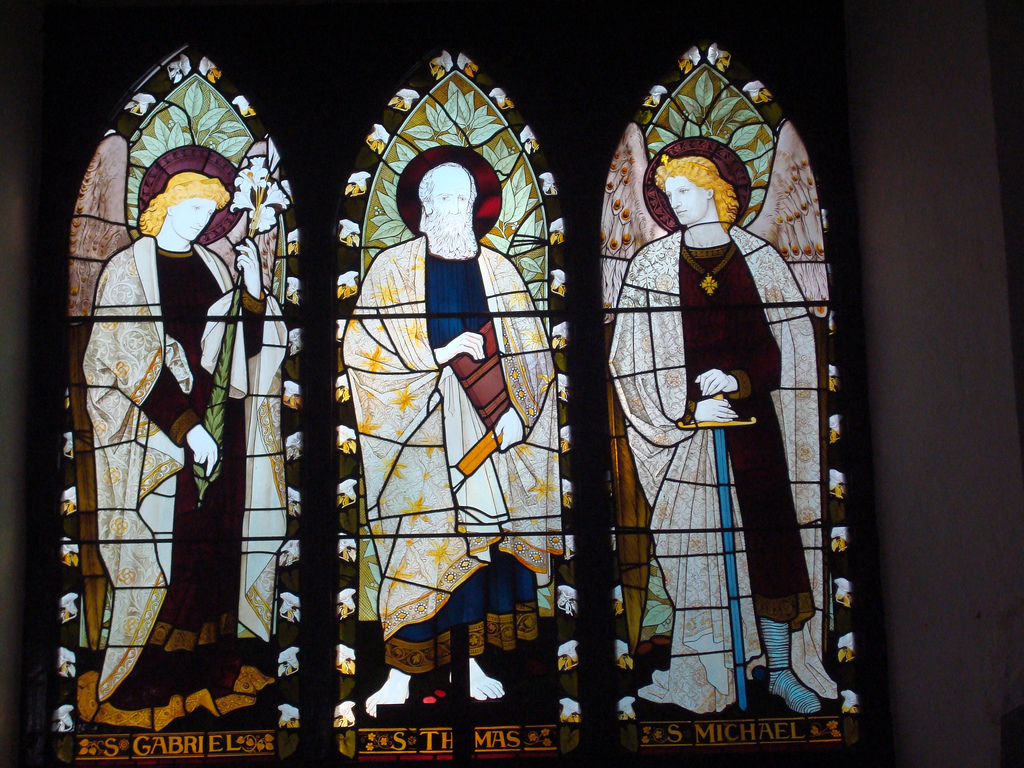
Stained glass window of Thomas the Apostle, the traditional founder of Indian Christianity, in his namesake St Thomas CNI church, the 300-year-old Cathedral of Mumbai (Bombay)

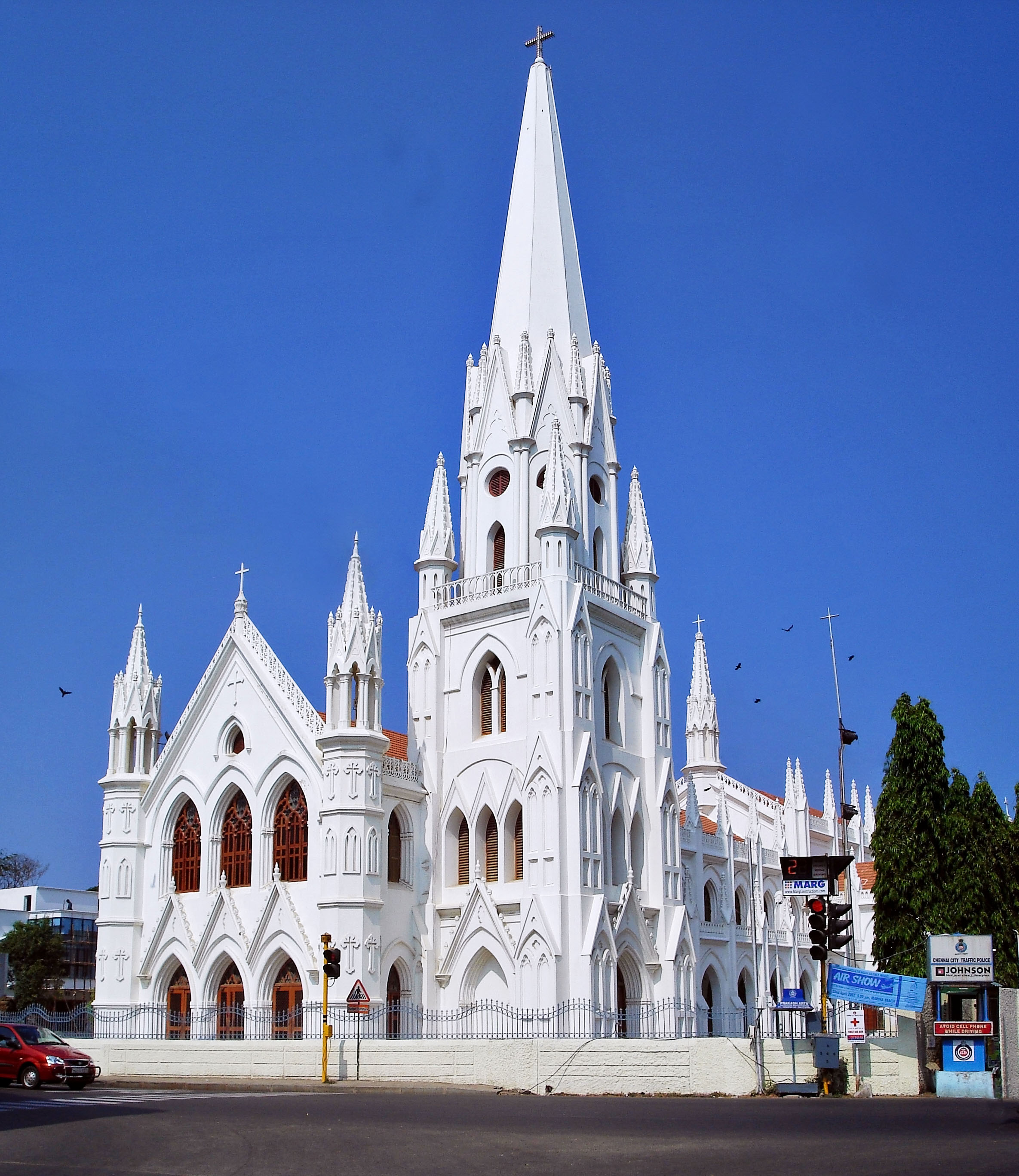
St. Thomas Cathedral Basilica, Chennai built over the tomb of Saint Thomas the Apostle

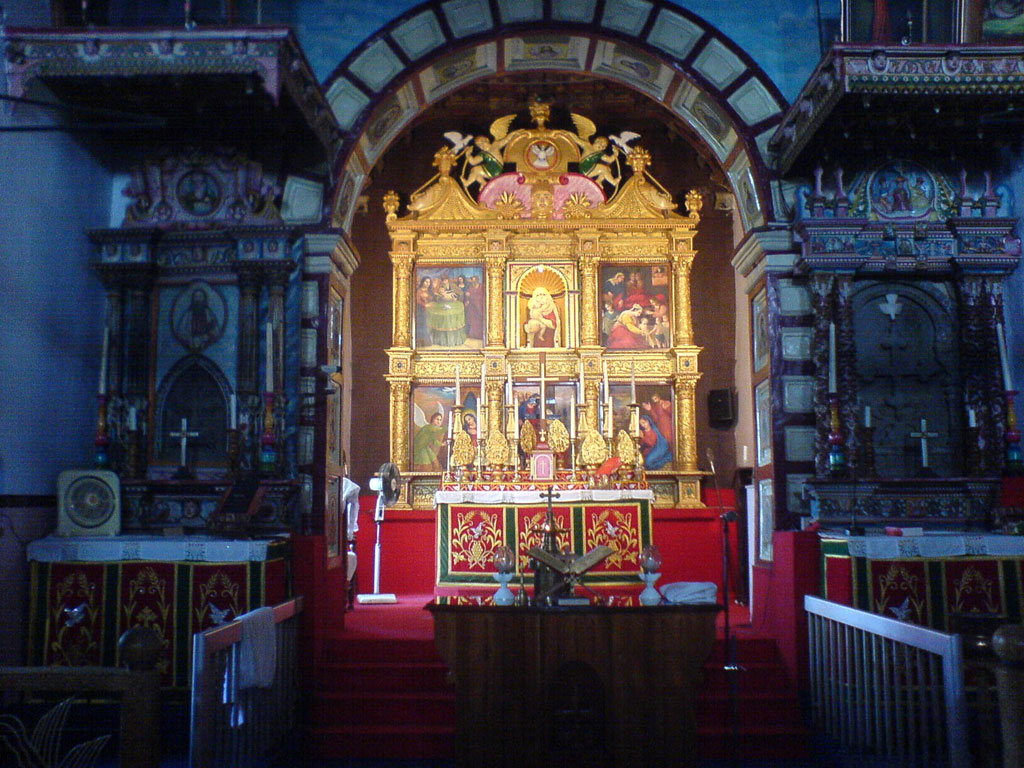
Altar of the St Mary's Church in Kottayam flanked by two St Thomas crosses from the 7th century AD on either side. The crosses pre-date the church which was built in 1550 AD.

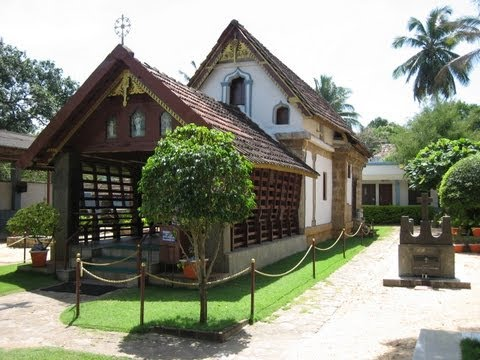
St Mary's Thiruvithamcode Arappally of Malankara Orthodox Syrian Church in Kanyakumari (Cape Comorin) is believed to have been founded by Thomas the Apostle in 63 AD.

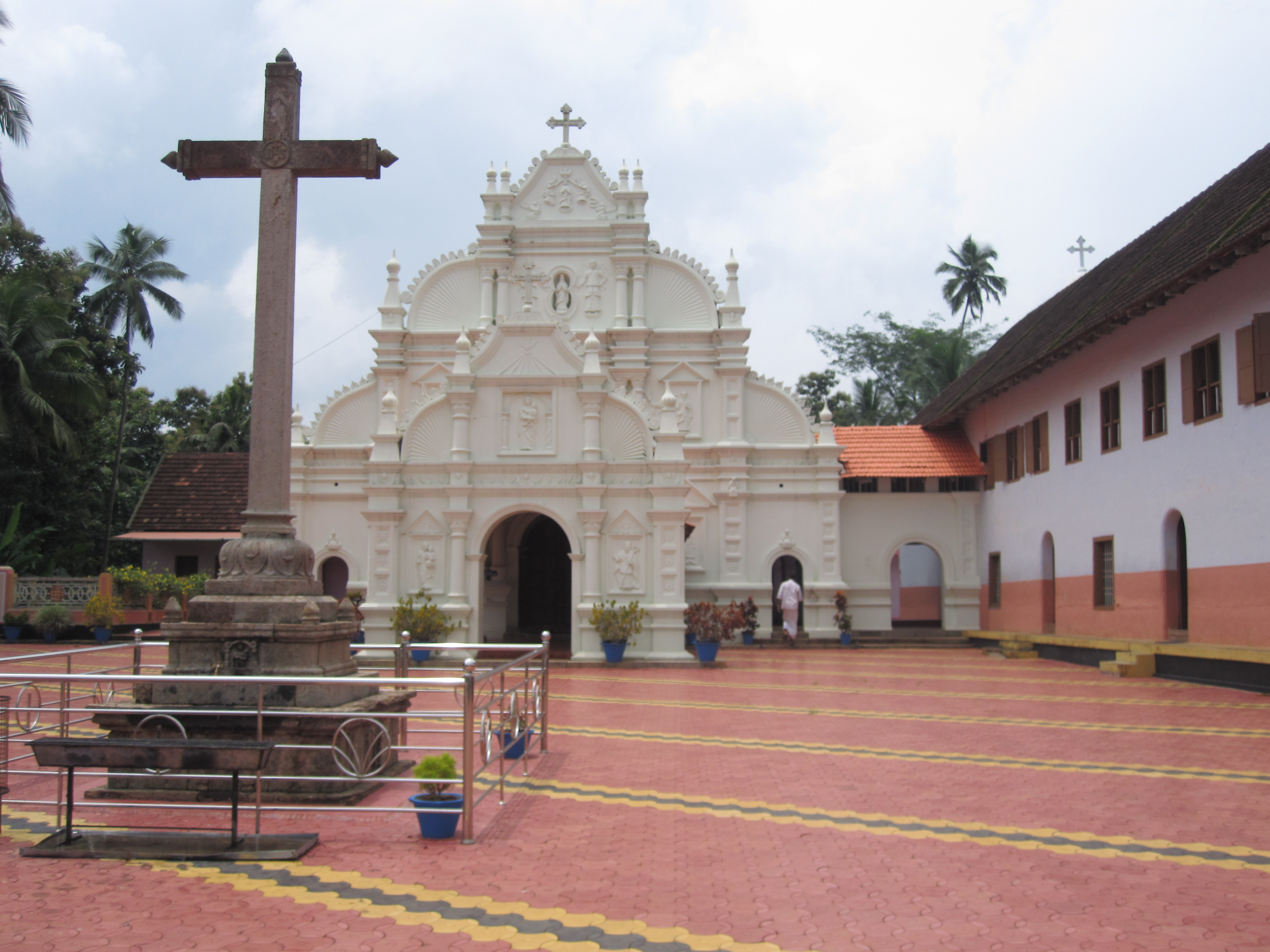
Marth Mariam Syro-Malabar Major Archiepiscopal Church at Arakuzha, Kerala is an ancient Nasrani church established in 999 AD.

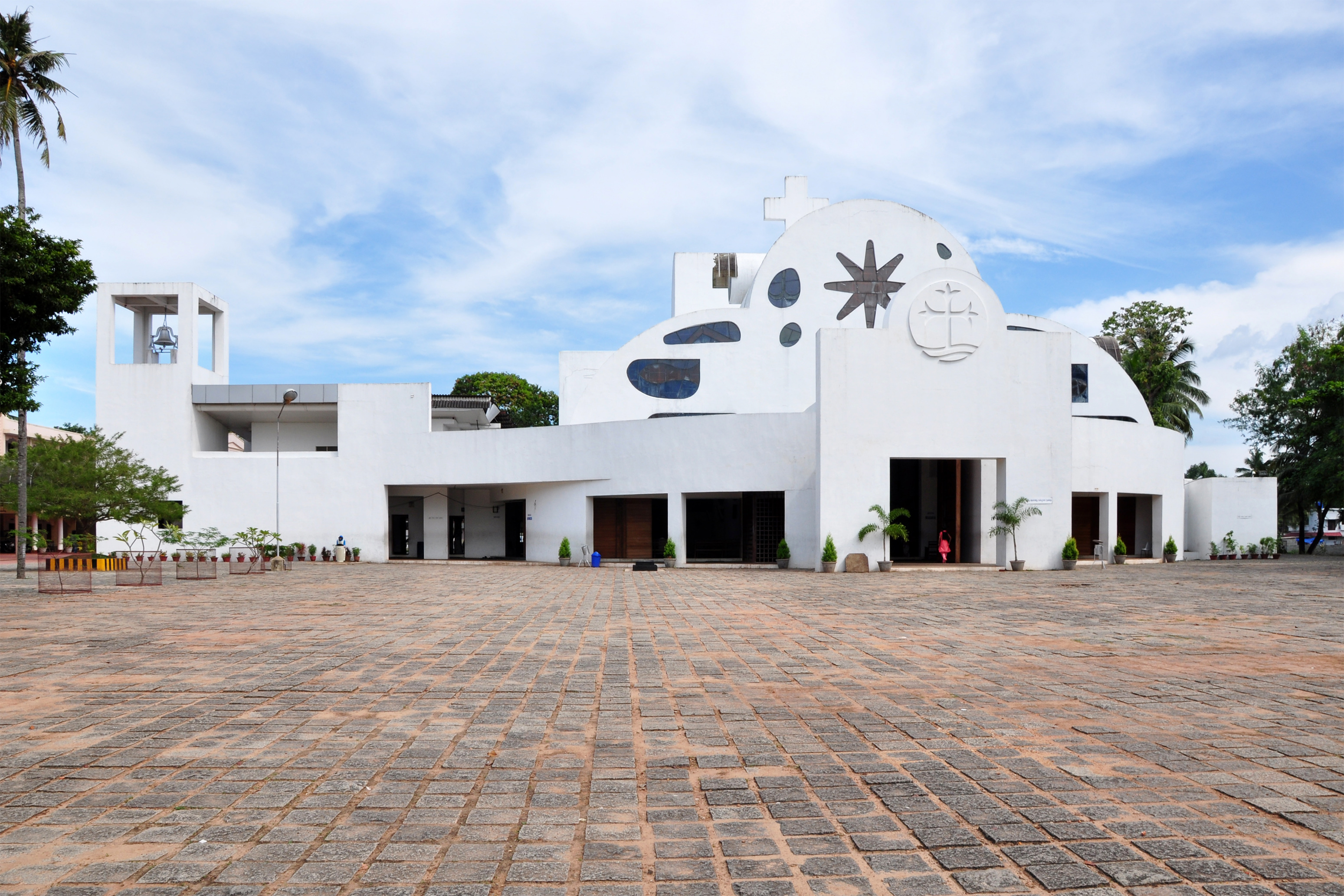
St. Peter and St. Paul's Church, Parumala, the shrine of St Geevargeese Mar Gregorios, an Oriental Orthodox Saint, in Kerala

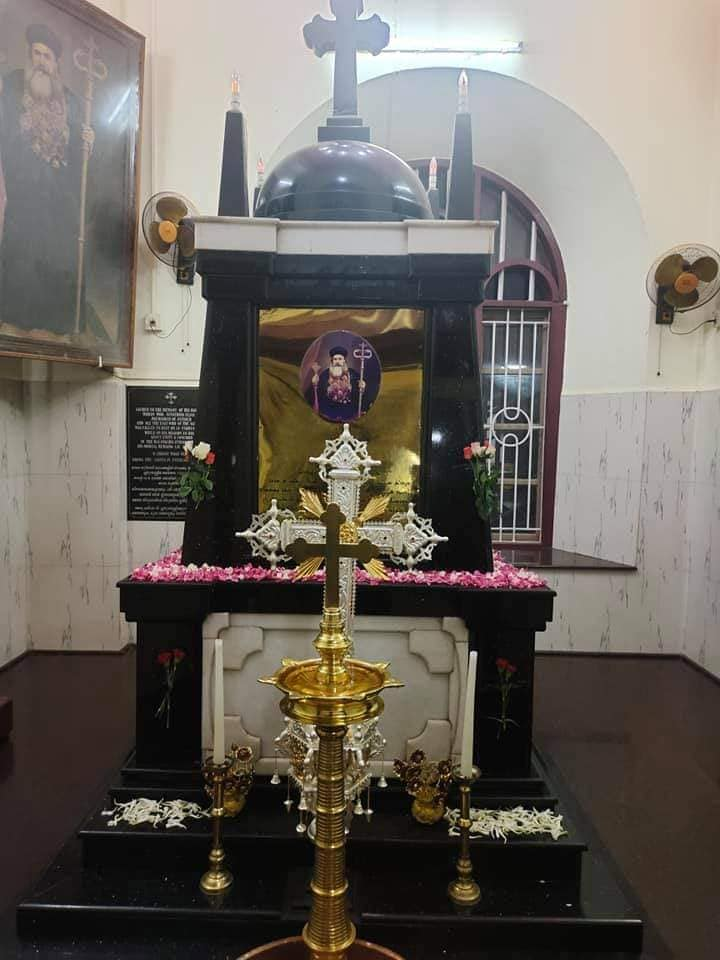
Tomb of the Saint Moran Mor Ignatius Elias Third (the only Universal Syrian Orthodox Patriarch to be buried in India) at Manjinikara, Kerala

== Medieval period ==
The Saint Thomas Christian community in Kerala was further strengthened by the arrival of various waves of Syriac Christians from the Middle East. This also resulted in the establishment of Knanaya colonies in Kerala during the 4th century. Babylonian Christians settled on the Malabar Coast in the 4th century. Mar Sabor and Mar Proth arrived in Kollam in the 9th century.

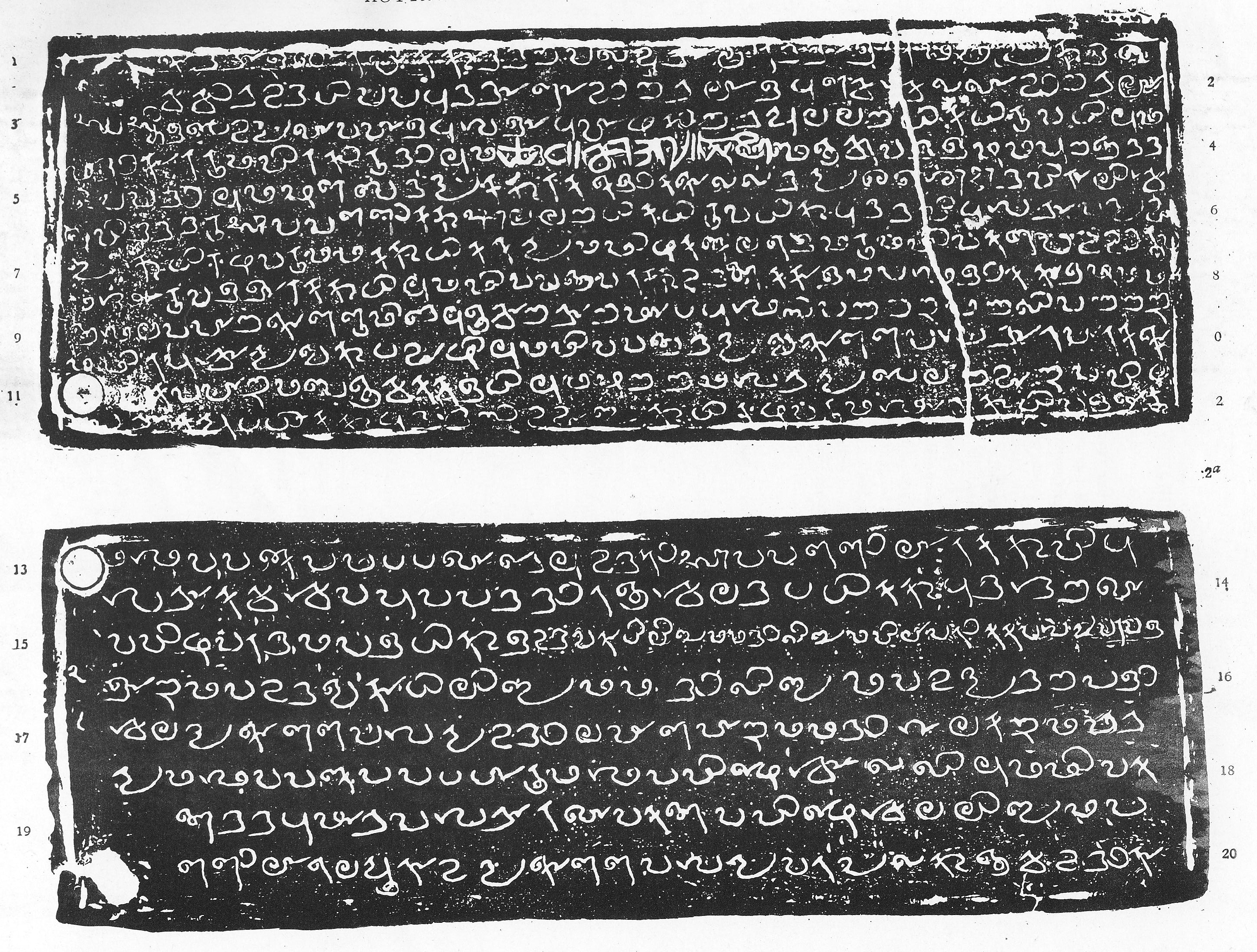
Kollam Tharisappalli or Quilon copper plates (849 AD) commissioned during the reign of Sthanu Ravi Varma, and given to the Syrian Christian leader Maruvan Sapir Iso, granting land for the construction of a Syrian Church near Kollam in Kerala

Saint Thomas Christians seem to have enjoyed various rights and privileges as well as a high status as recorded on copper plates, also known as Cheppeds, Royal Grants, Sasanam, etc. There are a number of such documents in the possession of the Syrian churches of Kerala which include the Thazhekad Sasanam, the Quilon Syrian copper plates (or Tharisappalli Cheppeds), Mampally Sasanam and Iraviikothan Chepped, etc. Some of these plates have been dated to around 774 AD. Scholars have studied the inscriptions and produced varying translations. The language used is Old Malayalam in Vattezhuthu script intermingled with some Grantha, Pahlavi, Kufic and Hebrew scripts. The ruler of Venad (Travancore) granted the Saint Thomas Christians seventy-two rights and privileges which were usually granted only to high dignitaries. These rights included exemption from import duties, sales tax and the slave tax. A copper plate grant dated 1225 AD further enhanced the rights and privileges of Nasranis.

Other references to Saint Thomas Christians include the South Indian epic of Manimekalai, written between the 2nd and 3rd century AD, which mentions the Nasrani people by referring to them by the name Essanis. The embassy of King Alfred in 883 AD sent presents to St. Thomas Christians. Marco Polo who visited in 1292, mentioned that there were Christians in the Malabar coast.

The French or Catalan Dominican missionary Jordan Catala was the first Catholic European missionary to arrive in India. He landed in Surat in around 1320. By a separate bull that reads Venerabili Fratri Jordano, he was appointed the first Bishop of Quilon on 21 August 1329 AD. In 1321, Jordanus Catalani also arrived in Bhatkal, a place near Mangalore, and established a missionary station there converting many locals. He also evangelised in Thana district (Trombay) near Bombay; the descendants of these converts would later become part of the Bombay East Indian community.

== Modern period ==
Church of the East and its dioceses and missions throughout Asia, including India

=== Portuguese efforts to Catholicise Saint Thomas Christians ===
Thomas the Apostle is credited by tradition for founding the Indian Church in 52 AD. This church developed contacts with the Church of the East religious authorities based in Edessa, Mesopotamia at the time.

Historically, this community was organised as the Province of India of the Church of the East by Patriarch of Babylon Timothy I (780–823 AD) in the eighth century, served by bishops and a local dynastic archdeacon. In the 14th century, the Church of the East declined due to persecution from Tamerlane. The 16th century witnessed the colonial overtures of the Portuguese Padroado aiming to bring St Thomas Christians into the Latin Catholic Church, administered by the Portuguese Padroado Archdiocese of Goa, leading to the first of several rifts in the community. The efforts of the Portuguese culminated in the Synod of Diamper, formally subjugating them and their whole Archdiocese of Angamaly as a suffragan see to the Archdiocese of Goa administered by Roman Catholic Padroado missionaries.

The death of the last metropolitan bishop – Archbishop Abraham of the Saint Thomas Christians, an ancient body formerly part of the Church of the East in 1597 gave the then Archbishop of Goa Menezes an opportunity to bring the native church under the authority of the Roman Catholic Church. He was able to secure the submission of Archdeacon George, the highest remaining representative of the native church hierarchy. Menezes convened the Synod of Diamper between 20 and 26 June 1599, which introduced a number of reforms to the church and brought it fully into the Latin Church of the Catholic Church. Following the Synod, Menezes consecrated Francis Ros, S. J. as Archbishop of the Archdiocese of Angamalé for the Saint Thomas Christians; thus created another suffragan see to Archdiocese of Goa and Latinisation of St Thomas Christians started. The Saint Thomas Christians were pressured to acknowledge the authority of the Pope and most of them eventually accepted the Catholic faith, but a part of them switched to West Syriac Rite. Resentment of these measures led to some part of the community to join the Archdeacon, Thomas, in swearing never to submit to the Portuguese Jesuits in the Coonan Cross Oath in 1653. Those who accepted the West Syriac theological and liturgical tradition of Gregorios became known as Jacobites. The others who continued with East Syriac theological and liturgical tradition stayed faithful to the Catholic Church and later became autonomous eastern catholic church named Syro Malabar Church (suriyani malabar sabha).

Following the synod, the Indian Church was governed by Portuguese prelates. They were generally unwilling to respect the integrity of the local church. This resulted in disaffection which led to a general revolt in 1653 known as the "Coonan Cross Oath". Under the leadership of Archdeacon Thomas, Nazranis around Cochin gathered at Mattancherry church on Friday, 24 January 1653 (M.E. 828 Makaram 3) and made an oath that is known as the Great Oath of Bent Cross. There are various versions about the wording of oath, one version being that the oath was directed against the Portuguese, another that it was directed against Jesuits, yet another version that it was directed against the authority of Church of Rome. Those who were not able to touch the cross tied ropes on the cross, held the rope in their hands and made the oath. Because of the weight it is believed by the followers that the cross bent a little and so it is known as "Oath of the bent cross" (Coonen Kurisu Sathyam). This demanded administrative autonomy for the local church.

A few months, later Archdeacon Thomas was ordained as bishop by twelve priests with the title Thoma I. At this time, Rome intervened and Carmelite Missionaries were sent to win the Thomas Christians back. Carmelites could convince the majority that the local church needs bishops and the consecration of the Archdeacon Thomas was invalid because the consecration was conducted not by a bishop, but by priests. Many leaders of the community rejoined the missionaries. But in 1663, Dutch conquered Cochin supplanting the Portuguese on the Malabar coast. Portuguese Missionaries had to leave the country and they consecrated Palliveettil Chandy kathanaar as the bishop for the Catholic Thomas Christians on 1 February 1663. Meanwhile, Thoma I appealed to several eastern Christian churches for regularising his consecration. The Syriac Orthodox Patriarch responded and sent metropolitan Gregorios Abdul Jaleel of Jerusalem to India in 1665. He confirmed Thoma I as a bishop and worked together with him to organise the Church. These events led to the gradual and lasting schism among the Saint Thomas Christians of India, leading to the formation of Puthenkūr (New allegiance) and Pazhayakūr (Old allegiance) factions.

Historic divisions among Saint Thomas Christians

The Pazhayakūr comprise the present day Syro-Malabar Catholic Church and Chaldean Syrian Church which continue to employ the East Syriac Rite. The Puthenkūr, who entered into a new communion with the Syriac Orthodox Church of Antioch, an Oriental Orthodox church, inherited from them the West Syriac Rite, replacing the old East Syriac Rite liturgy. Puthenkūr is the body from which present day Jacobite Syrian Christian Church, Malankara Orthodox Syrian Church, CSI Syrian Christians, Mar Thoma Syrian Church, St. Thomas Evangelical Church of India, Syro-Malankara Catholic Church and Malabar Independent Syrian Church originate.

=== Arrival of Europeans ===
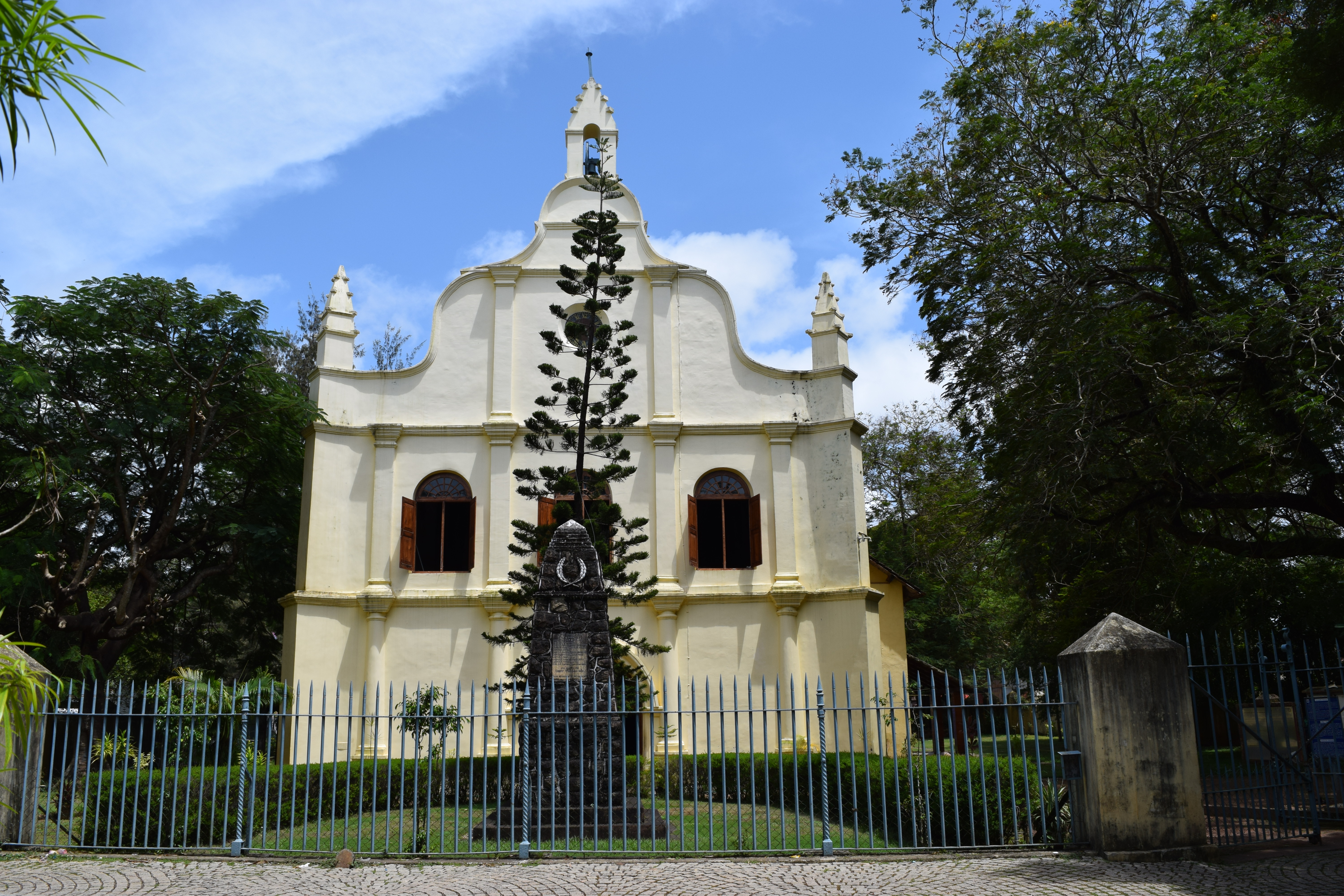
St. Francis Church, Kochi, originally built in 1503, is the first European colonial church built in India. The Portuguese explorer Vasco da Gama died at Cochin in 1524 and was originally buried in this church.

In 1453, the fall of Constantinople to the Sunni Islamic Ottoman Caliphate marked the end of the Byzantine (Eastern Roman Empire), and severed European trade links by land with Asia. This massive blow to Christendom spurred the Age of Discovery as Europeans started seeking alternative routes east by sea along with the goal of forging alliances with pre-existing Christian nations. Along with Portuguese long-distance maritime travelers that reached the Malabar Coast in the late 15th century, came Portuguese missionaries who made contact with the St Thomas Christians in Kerala. These Christians were following Eastern Christian practices and under the jurisdiction of Church of the East. The missionaries sought to introduce the Latin liturgical rites among them and unify East Syriac Christians in India under the Holy See. This group, which existed in Kerala relatively peacefully for more than a millennium, faced considerable persecution from Portuguese evangelists in the 16th century. This later wave of evangelism spread Catholicism more widely along the Konkan coast.

The South Indian coastal areas around Kanyakumari were known for pearl fisheries ruled by the Paravars. From 1527, the Paravars, being threatened by Arab fleets offshore who were supported Zamorin of Calicut, sought the protection of the Portuguese who had moved into the area. The protection was granted on the condition that the leaders were immediately baptised as Christians and that they would encourage their people also to convert to Christianity. The Portuguese in turn wanted to gain a strategic foothold and control of the pearl fisheries. The deal was agreed and some months later 20,000 Paravars were baptised en masse, and by 1537 the entire community had declared itself to be Christian. The Portuguese navy destroyed the Arab fleet at Vedalai on 27 June 1538.

Francis Xavier, a Jesuit, began a mission to the lower classes of Tamil society in 1542. A further 30,000 Paravars were baptised. Xavier appointed catechists in the Paravar villages up and down the 100 miles (160 km) coastline to spread and reinforce his teachings. Paravar Christianity, with its own identity based on a mixture of Christian religious belief and Hindu caste culture, remains a defining part of the Paravar life today.

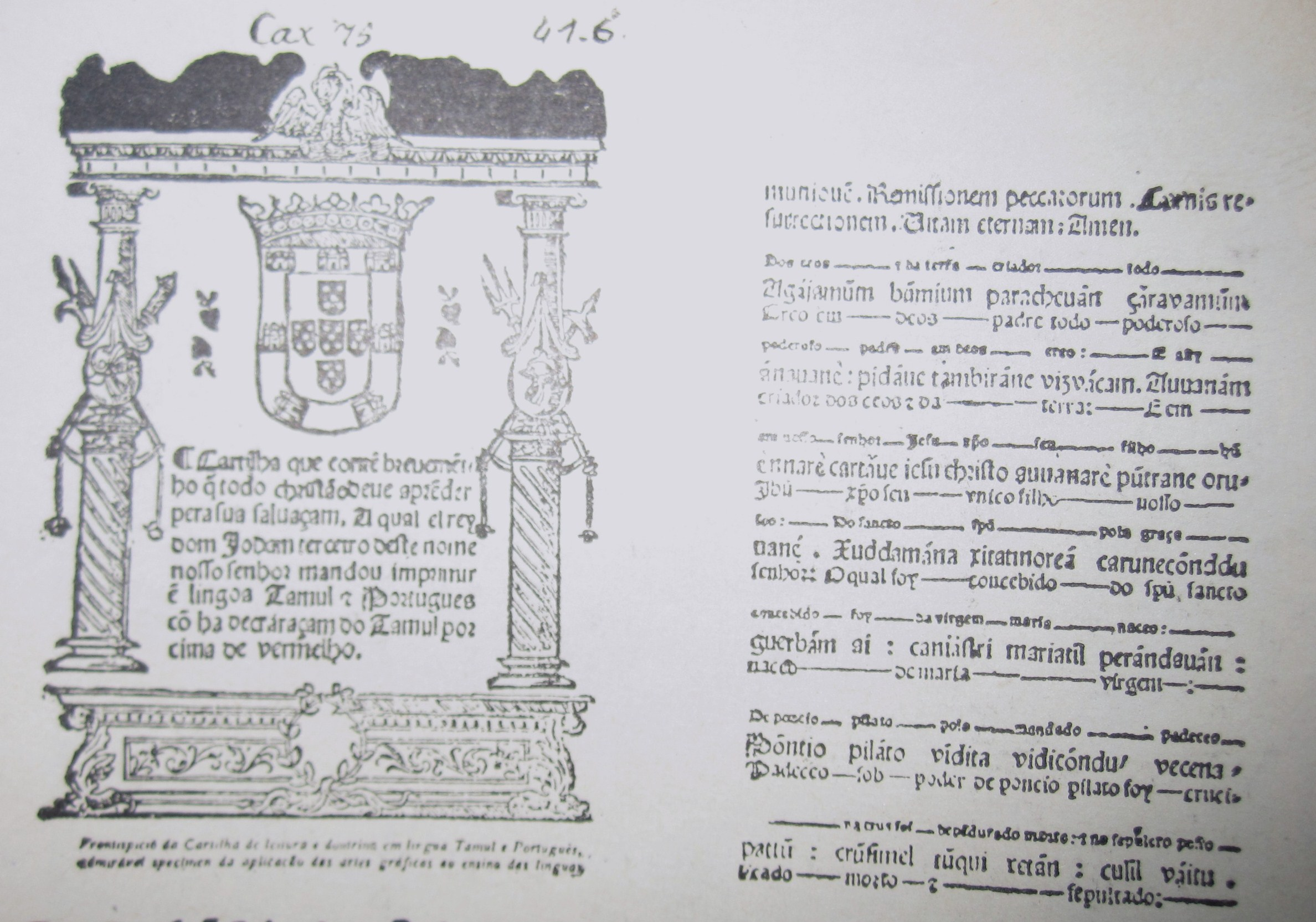
Portuguese-Tamil Primer (1554). One of the earliest known Christian books in an Indian language

In the 16th century, the proselytisation of Asia was linked to the Portuguese colonial policy. Missionaries of the different orders including Franciscans, Dominicans, Jesuits, Augustinians arrived with the Portuguese colonisers. The history of Portuguese missionaries in India starts with the Portuguese clergy who reached Kappad near Kozhikode on 20 May 1498, along with the Portuguese explorer Vasco da Gama who was seeking to form anti-Islamic alliances with pre-existing Christian nations. The lucrative spice trade was further temptation for the Portuguese crown. When he and the Portuguese missionaries arrived, they found Christians in the country in Malabar known as St. Thomas Christians who belonged to the then-largest Christian church within India. The Christians were friendly to Portuguese missionaries at first; there was an exchange of gifts between them, and these groups were delighted at their common faith.

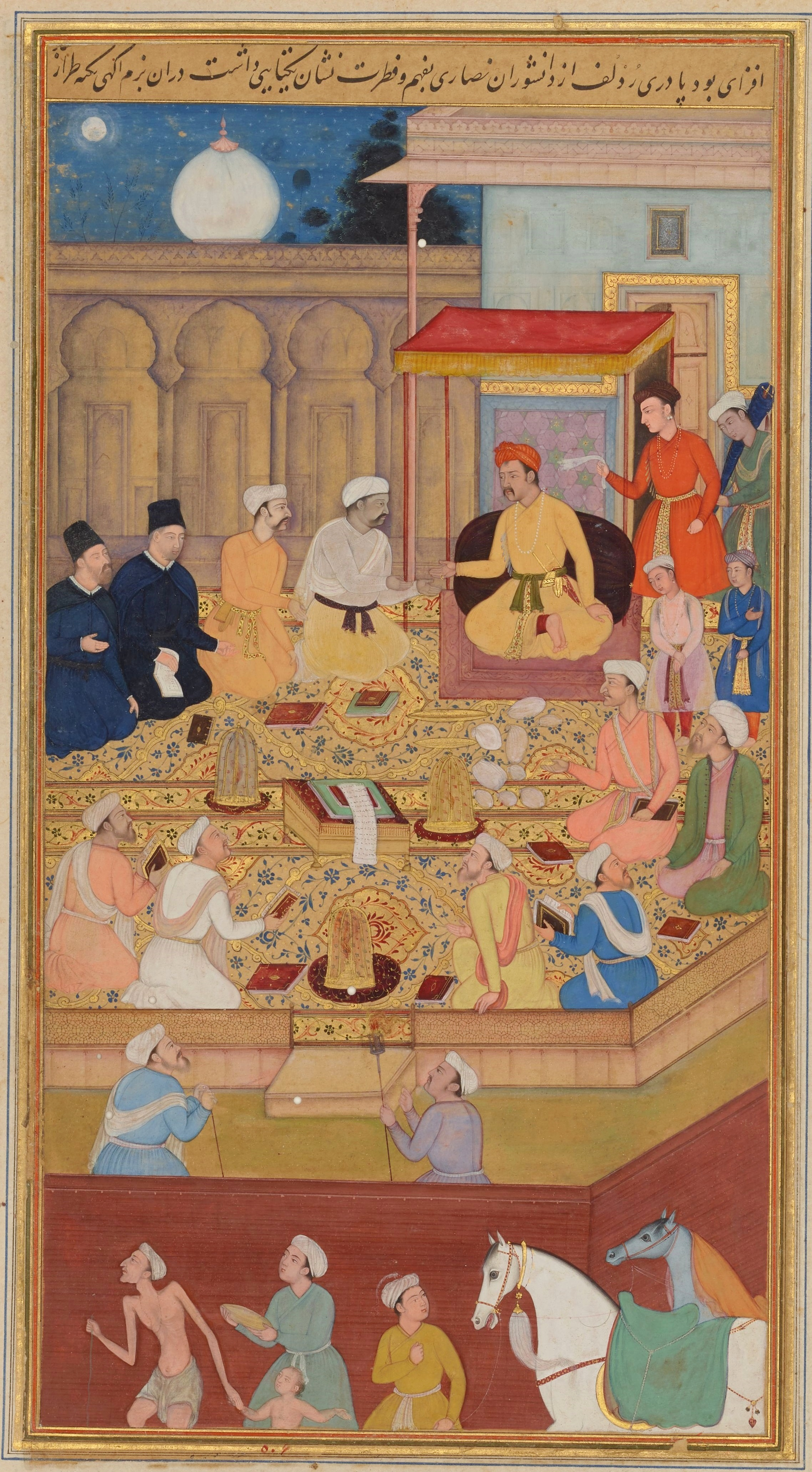
Mughal Emperor Akbar the Great holds a religious assembly in the Ibadat Khana; the two men dressed in black are Jesuit missionaries, c. 1605.

During the second expedition, the Portuguese fleet comprising 13 ships and 18 priests, under Captain Pedro Álvares Cabral, anchored at Cochin on 26 November 1500. Cabral soon won the goodwill of the Raja of Cochin. He allowed four priests to do apostolic work among the early Christian communities scattered in and around Cochin. Thus Portuguese missionaries established Portuguese Mission in 1500. Dom Francisco de Almeida, the first Portuguese Viceroy got permission from the Kochi Raja to build two churches – namely Santa Cruz Basilica (1505) and St. Francis Church (1506) using stones and mortar, which was unheard of at that time, as the local prejudices were against such a structure for any purpose other than a royal palace or a temple.

In the beginning of the 16th century, the whole of the east was under the jurisdiction of the Archdiocese of Lisbon. On 12 June 1514, Cochin and Goa became two prominent mission stations under the newly created Diocese of Funchal in Madeira. In 1534, Pope Paul III by the Bull Quequem Reputamus, raised Funchal as an archdiocese and Goa as its suffragan, deputing the whole of India under the diocese of Goa. This created an episcopal see – suffragan to Funchal, with a jurisdiction extending potentially over all past and future conquests from the Cape of Good Hope to China.

The first converts to Christianity in Goa were native Goan women who married Portuguese men that arrived with Afonso de Albuquerque during the Portuguese conquest of Goa in 1510. Due to the Christianisation of Goa, over 90% of the Goans in the Velhas Conquistas became Catholic by the 1700s.

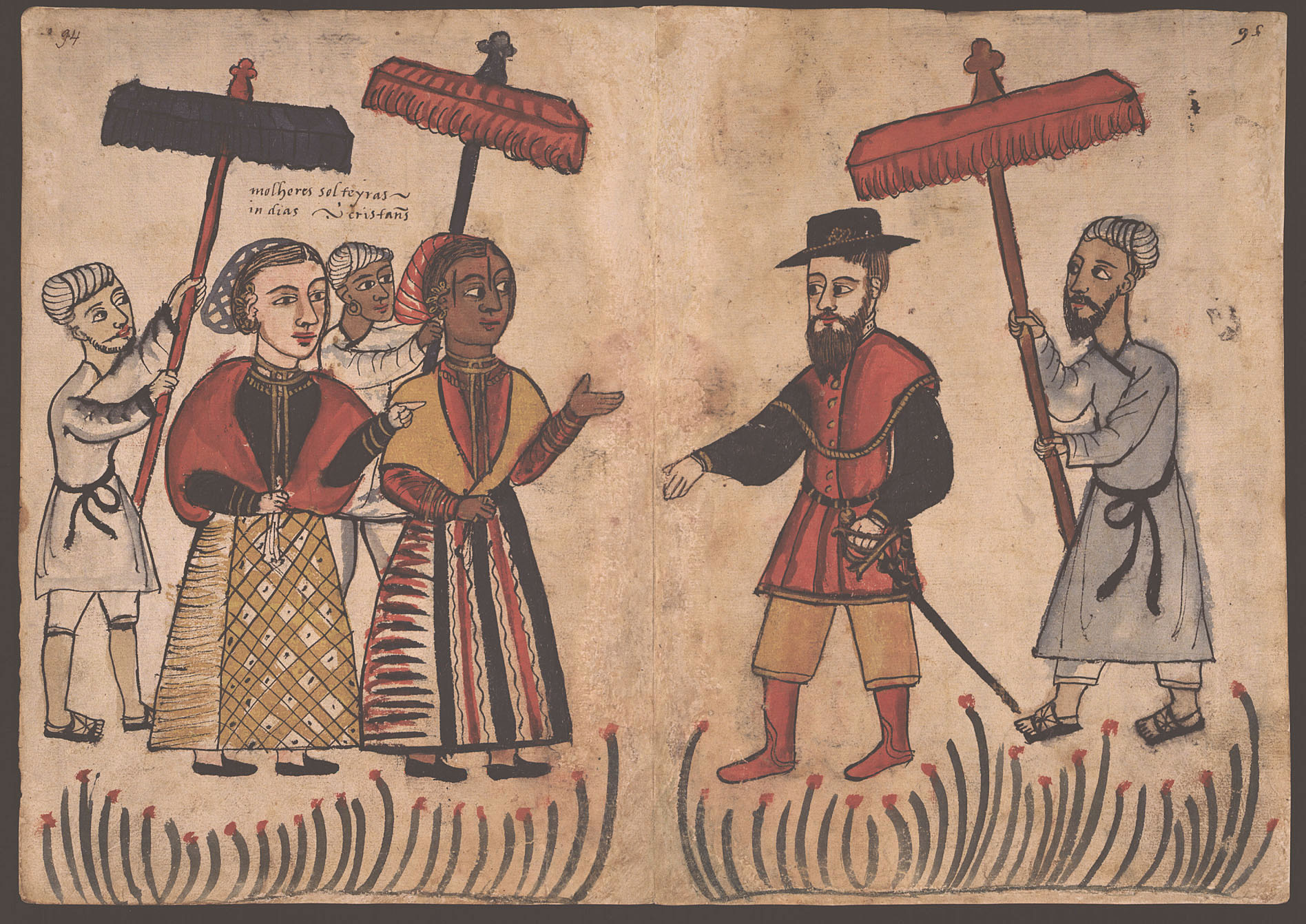
Christian maidens of Goa meeting a Portuguese nobleman seeking a wife, from the Códice Casanatense (c. 1540)

The Portuguese government supported the missionaries. At the same time many New Christians from Portugal emigrated to India as a result of the Portuguese Inquisition. Many of them were suspected of being Crypto-Jews and Crypto-Muslims, converted Jews and Muslims who were secretly practising their old religions. Both were considered a threat to the solidarity of Christian belief. According to Maria Aurora Couto, Jesuit missionary Francis Xavier requested the installation of the Goa Inquisition in a letter dated 16 May 1546 to King John III of Portugal, but the tribunal commenced only in 1560. The Inquisition office persecuted Hindus, Muslims, Bene Israels, New Christians and the Judaising Nasranis. Crypto-Hindus were the primary target of the 250 years of persecution and punishment for their faith by the Catholic prosecutors. Most affected were the Shudras (12.5%) and farmers (35.5%).

In 1557, Goa was made an independent archbishopric, and its first suffragan sees were erected at Cochin and Malacca. The whole of the East came under the jurisdiction of Goa and its boundaries extended to almost half of the world: from the Cape of Good Hope in South Africa, to Burma, China and Japan in East Asia. In 1576, the suffragan See of Macao (China) was added; and in 1588, that of Funai in Japan.

The Diocese of Angamaly was transferred to Diocese of Craganore in 1605, while, in 1606 a sixth suffragan see to Goa was established at San Thome, Mylapore, near the modern Madras, and the site of the National Shrine of St. Thomas Basilica. The suffragan sees added later to Goa. were the prelacy of Mozambique (1612), Peking (1609) and Nanking (1609) in China.

A significant portion of the crew on Portuguese ships were Indian Christians.

The Portuguese were however unable to establish their presence in Mangalore as a result of the conquests of the Vijayanagara ruler Krishnadevaraya and Abbakka Rani of Ullal, the Bednore Queen of Mangalore. Most of Mangalorean Catholics were not originally from Mangalore but from Goa, which they fled during the Sackings of Goa and Bombay-Bassein and to escape the persecution of the Goan Inquisition.

The Franciscans spearheaded the evangelisation of the "Province of the North" (Província do Norte) headquartered at Fort San Sebastian of Bassein (close to present day Mumbai), but the fort's officials were subordinate to the viceroy in the capital of Velha Goa. From 1534 to 1552, a priest by the name António do Porto converted over 10,000 people, built a dozen churches, convents, and a number of orphanages hospitals and seminaries. Prominent among the converts were two yogis from the Kanheri Caves who became known as Paulo Raposo and Francisco de Santa Maria. They introduced Christianity to their fellow yogis, converting many in the process. The descendants of these Christians are today known as the Bombay East Indian Christians who are predominantly Roman Catholics and inhabitants of the north Konkan region.

In Portuguese Bombay and Bassein missionary work progressed on a large scale and with great success along the western coasts, chiefly at Chaul, Bombay, Salsette, Bassein, Damao, and Diu; and on the eastern coasts at San Thome of Mylapore, and as far as Bengal etc. In the southern districts the Jesuit mission in Madura was the most famous. It extended to the Krishna river, with a number of outlying stations beyond it. The mission of Cochin, on the Malabar Coast, was also one of the most fruitful. Several missions were also established in the interior northwards that of Agra and Lahore in 1570 and that of Tibet in 1624. Still, even with these efforts, and many vast tracts of the interior northwards were practically unreached.

With the decline of the Portuguese power, other colonial powers namely the Dutch and British gained influence, paving the way for the arrival of Protestantism.

=== Arrival of Protestant missions ===
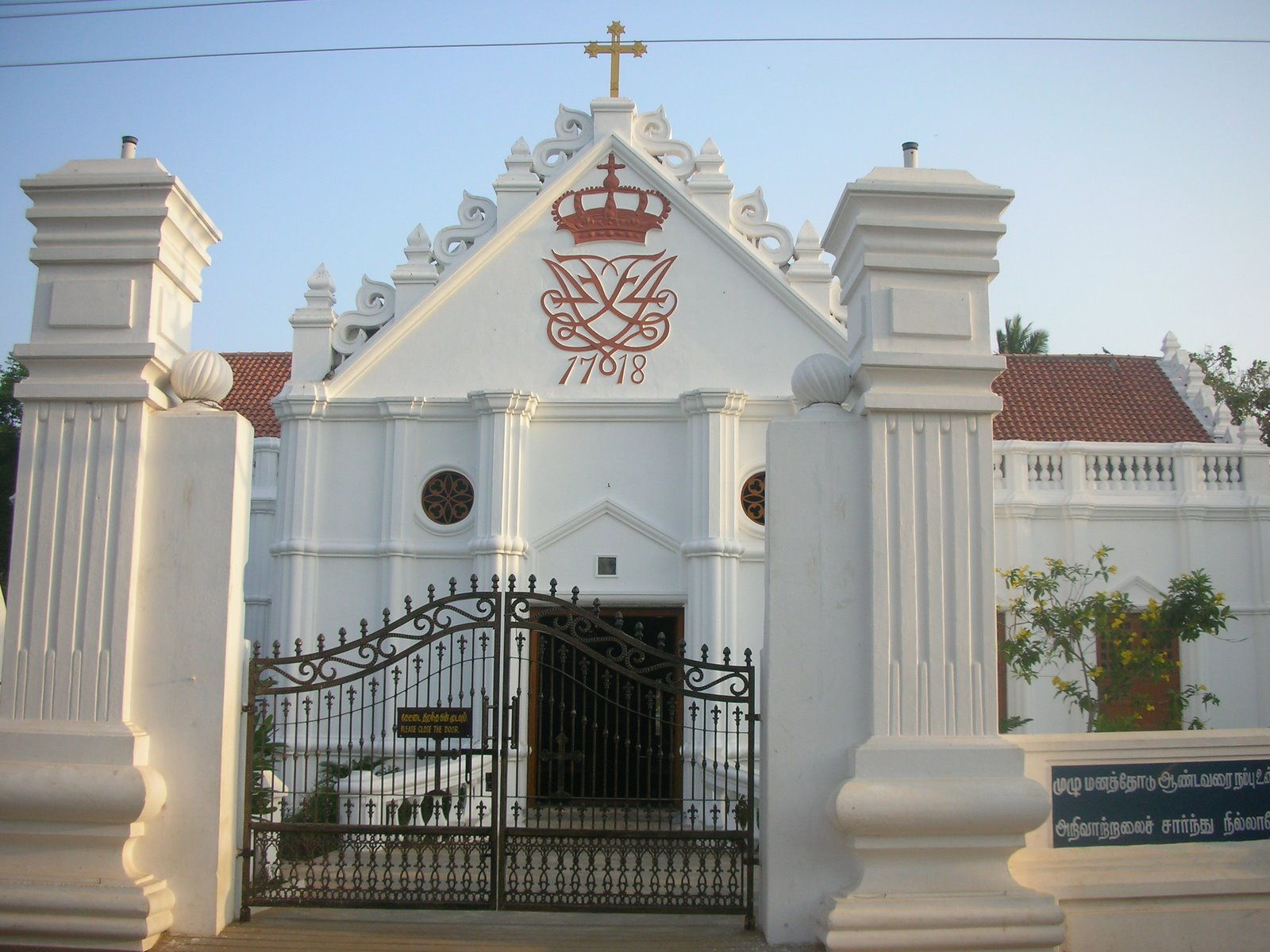
New Jerusalem Church, Tranquebar, built in 1718, is one of the oldest Protestant churches in India.

Beginning in about 1700, Protestant missionaries began working throughout India; this led to the establishment of different Christian communities across the Indian Subcontinent.

==== German Lutherans and Basel mission ====
The first Protestant missionaries to set foot in India were two Lutherans from Germany, Bartholomäus Ziegenbalg and Heinrich Plütschau, who began work in 1705 in the Danish settlement of Tranquebar. They translated the Bible into the local Tamil language, and afterwards into Hindustani. They made little progress at first, but gradually the mission spread to Madras, Cuddalore and Tanjore. The Bishop of Tranquebar is still the official title of the bishop of the Tamil Evangelical Lutheran Church in Tamil Nadu which was founded in 1919 as a result of the German Lutheran Leipzig Mission and Church of Sweden Mission, the successors of Bartholomäus Ziegenbalg and Heinrich Plütschau. The seat of the bishop, the cathedral and its church house, the Tranquebar House are in Tiruchirappalli.

German missionary Johann Phillip Fabricius, who arrived in South India in 1740, published the first Tamil to English dictionary and refined the Tamil Bible translation.

Christian Friedrich Schwarz was a prominent German Lutheran missionary who arrived in India in 1750. His mission was instrumental in the conversion of many people from Tamil Nadu to Lutheranism. He died in Tamil Nadu and was buried in St.Peter's Church at Thanjavur, Tamil Nadu.

Hermann Gundert a German missionary, scholar, and linguist, as well as the maternal grandfather of German novelist and Nobel laureate Hermann Hesse was a missionary in the South Indian state of Kerala and was instrumental in compiling a Malayalam grammar book, Malayalabhaasha Vyakaranam (1859), in which he developed and constructed the grammar currently spoken by the Malayalis, published a Malayalam-English dictionary (1872), and contributed to work on Bible translations into Malayalam.

Eugen Liebendörfer was the first German missionary doctor in India as part of the Basel Mission. He built hospitals in Kerala and Karnataka.

Another Basel Missionary Ferdinand Kittel worked in South Indian state of Karnataka in places such as Mangalore, Madikeri and Dharwad in Karnataka. He is renowned for his studies of the Kannada language and for producing a Kannada-English dictionary of about 70,000 words in 1894. He also composed numerous Kannada poems.

Hermann Mögling was a German missionary to Karnataka, he is credited as the publisher of the first ever newspaper in the Kannada language called as Mangalooru Samachara in 1843. He was awarded a doctorate for his literary work in Kannada called as Bibliotheca Carnataca. He also translated Kannada literature into German.

Another Lutheran German missionary to Kerala was Volbrecht Nagel, he was a missionary to the Malabar coast of India. Initially associated with the Evangelical Lutheran Church, he later joined the Open Brethren, and is remembered now as a pioneer of the Kerala Brethren movement.

==== William Carey and the Baptists ====
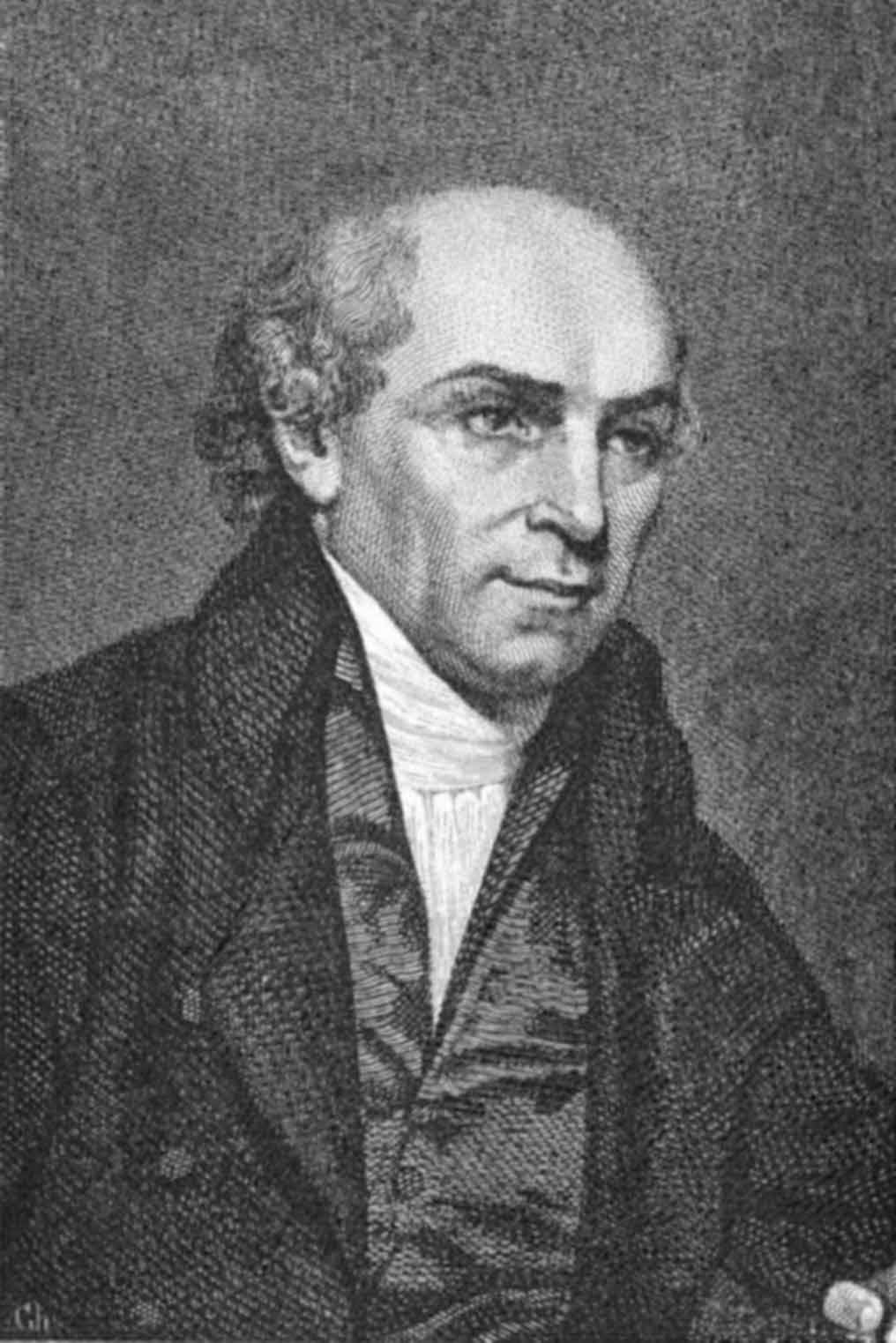
William Carey, 1761–1834

In 1793, William Carey, an English Baptist Minister, came to India as a missionary but also as a man of learning in economics, medicine and botany. He worked in Serampore, Calcutta, and other places. He translated the Bible into Bengali, Sanskrit, and numerous other languages and dialects. He worked in India despite the hostility of the British East India Company until his death in 1834. Carey and his colleagues, Joshua Marshman and William Ward, blended science, Christianity, and constructive Orientalism in their work at the Danish settlement of Serampore, near Calcutta. Carey saw the dissemination of European science and Christianity as mutually supportive and equally important civilising missions. He also supported a revival of Sanskrit science. Carey played a key role in the establishment of the Agricultural Society of India. Ward, beginning in 1806, published important commentaries on ancient Hindu medical and astronomy texts. In 1818, Carey and his fellow missionaries founded Serampore College to nurture a uniquely Indian variety of European science.

Established in 1818, Serampore College is one of the oldest continuously operating educational institutions in India.

==== Other missions ====
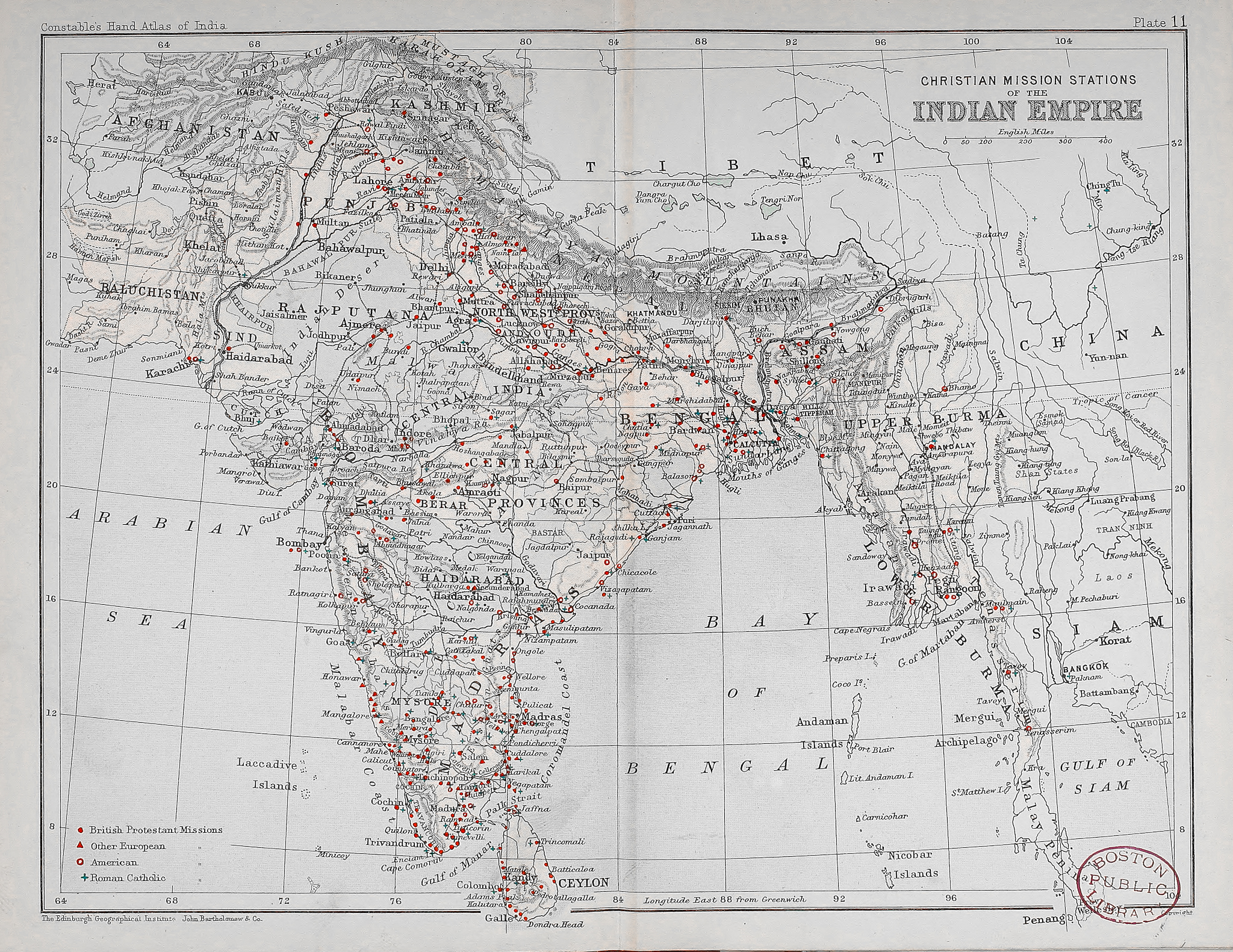
Christian Mission Stations of the Indian Empire, 1893

The London Missionary Society was the first Protestant mission in Andhra Pradesh which established its station at Visakhapatnam in 1805. Anthony Norris Groves, a Plymouth Brethren missionary arrived in 1833. He worked in the Godavari delta area until his death in 1852. John Christian Frederick Heyer was the first Lutheran missionary in the region of Andhra Pradesh. He founded the Guntur Mission in 1842. Supported initially by the Pennsylvania Ministerium, and later by the Foreign Mission Board of the General Synod, Heyer was also encouraged and assisted by British government officials. He established a number of hospitals and a network of schools throughout the Guntur region.

The Church Missionary Society (CMS), a mission society working with the Anglican Communion, began sending missionaries to India and established mission stations at Chennai (Madras) and Bengal, then in 1816 at Travancore. The CMS Mission to India expanded in the following years. The successors of the Protestant church missions are the Church of South India and the Church of North India.

Marathi Christians can be found in the areas of Ahmednagar, Solapur, Poona, and Aurangabad. They were converted through the efforts of the American Marathi Mission, The SPG Mission, and the Church Mission Society of Church of England in the early 18th century. British missionary William Carey was instrumental in translating the Bible into the Marathi language.

During the Bettiah Raj of Bihar, the ethnoreligious community of Bettiah Christians was established in India in the 17th century by Christian missionaries belonging to the Order of Friars Minor Capuchin, a Roman Catholic religious order. The Capuchins were personally invited to establish the Bettiah Christian Mission by Maharaja Dhurup Singh after the Italian Capuchin priest Joseph Mary Bernini treated his ill wife. Pope Benedict XIV, on 1 May 1742, approved the appointment of the Capuchins at the Bettiah Fort in a letter to Maharaja Dhurup Singh.

Many upper-class Bengalis converted to Christianity during the Bengali Renaissance under British Rule, including Krishna Mohan Banerjee, Michael Madhusudan Dutt, Anil Kumar Gain, and Gnanendramohan Tagore, Aurobindo Nath Mukherjee.

Christianity region of British India, 1931

During the 19th century, several American Baptist missionaries evangelised in the northeastern parts of India. In 1876, Dr. E. W. Clark first went to live in a Naga village, four years after his Assamese helper, Godhula, baptised the first Naga converts. Rev. and Mrs. A.F. Merrill arrived in India in 1928 and worked in the southeast section of the Garo Hills. Rev. and Mrs. M.J. Chance spent most of the years between 1950 and 1956 at Golaghat working with the Naga and Garo tribes. Even today, the heaviest concentrations of Christians in India continue to be in the Northeast among the Nagas, Khasis, Kukis, and Mizos.

=== Role in the Indian independence movement ===
Indian Christians were involved even at early stages of the nationalist movement in colonial India, both in the Indian National Congress and the wider Indian independence movement:

Indian Christian involvement in the early stages of the nationalist movement is also reflected in the high levels of participation in the activities of the Indian National Congress. During the period from its inception up until about 1892 all the evidence suggests that Indian Christians enthusiastically supported the National Congress and attended its annual meetings. For example, according to the official Congress report, there were 607 registered delegates at the Madras meeting of 1887; thirty-five were Christians and, of these, seven were Eurasians and fifteen were Indian Christians. Indian Christians alone made up 2.5 per cent of the total attendance, in spite of the fact that Christians accounted for less than 0.79 per cent of the population. The Indian Christian community was also well represented at the next four sessions of the Congress. The proportion of Indian Christian delegates remained very much higher than their proportion in the population, in spite of the fact that meetings were sometimes held in cities such as Allahabad and Nagpur, far removed from the main centres of Christian population.

The All India Conference of Indian Christians (AICIC) played an important role in the Indian independence movement, advocating for swaraj and opposing the partition of India. The AICIC also was opposed to separate electorates for Christians, believing that the faithful "should participate as common citizens in one common, national political system". The All India Conference of Indian Christians and the All India Catholic Union formed a working committee with M. Rahnasamy of Andhra University serving as president and B.L. Rallia Ram of Lahore serving as general secretary; in its meeting on 16 April 1947 and 17 April 1947, the joint committee prepared a 13-point memorandum that was sent to the Constituent Assembly of India, which asked for religious freedom for both organisations and individuals; this came to be reflected in the Constitution of India.

== Art and architecture ==
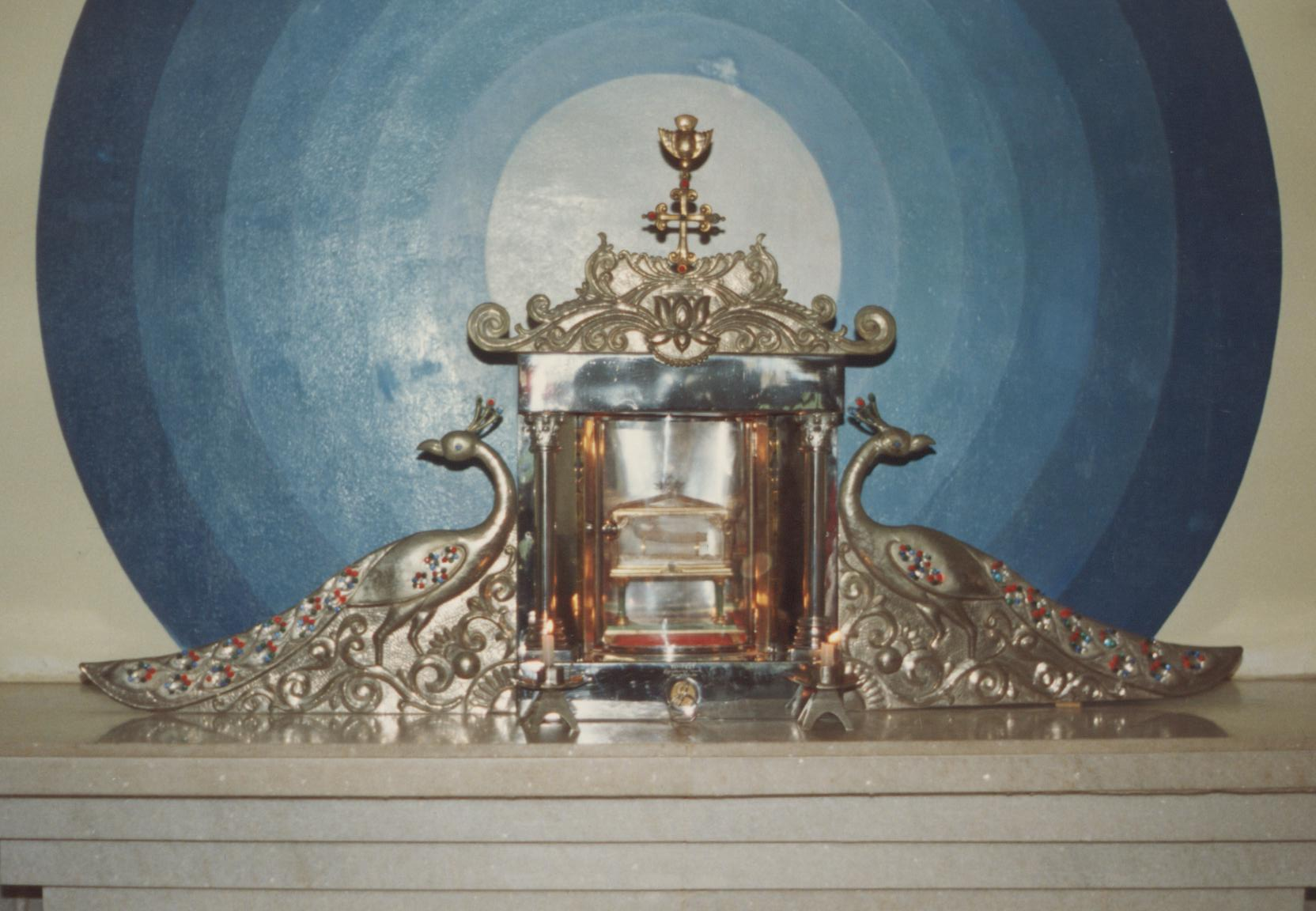
Reliquary of St Thomas the Apostle, kept at Kodungallur (Cranganore) church, Kerala

There are a large number of items of artistic and architectural significance in the religious and domestic life of Indian Christians. Altars, statues, pulpits, crosses, bells and belfries of churches along with other household items are among the many things that form part of the sacred art of the Indian Christians.

The following artistic elements predate European Christianity and form an integral part of the religious art and architecture of the Saint Thomas Christians:

- The open-air granite (rock) cross called the Nasrani Sthamba
- Kodimaram (Dwajasthamba) or flag-staff made of Kerala's famed teak wood and often enclosed in copper hoses or paras
- The rock Deepasthamba or lampstand.

After the arrival of Vasco da Gama and more especially after the commencement of Portuguese rule in India, distinct patterns of Christian art developed within the areas of Portuguese influence, mostly along the coasts of the peninsula. The Portuguese commissioned monumental buildings and promoted architecture more than any other form of fine art. St. Francis Church, Kochi is the first European place of worship in India and incidentally also the place where Vasco da Gama was first buried. The Christian art of Goa reached its climax in church building, laying the foundations of Indian Baroque.

Indian Christian architecture during the British Raj has expanded into several different styles as a result of extensive church building in different parts of the country. The style that was most patronised is generally referred to as the British Regency style followed by Neo-Gothic and Gothic Revival architecture. Most Protestant cathedrals and churches in India conform to the Neo-Gothic and Gothic Revival architecture styles. The adaptation of European architectural elements to the tropical climate in India has resulted in the creation of the Indo-Gothic style. St. Paul's Cathedral, Kolkata, is a typical example of this style. St. Mary's Church, Chennai, the first Anglican church built east of the Suez, is one of the first examples of British colonial architecture in India. French and Danish influences on Christian art and architecture in India can be seen in their respective colonies.

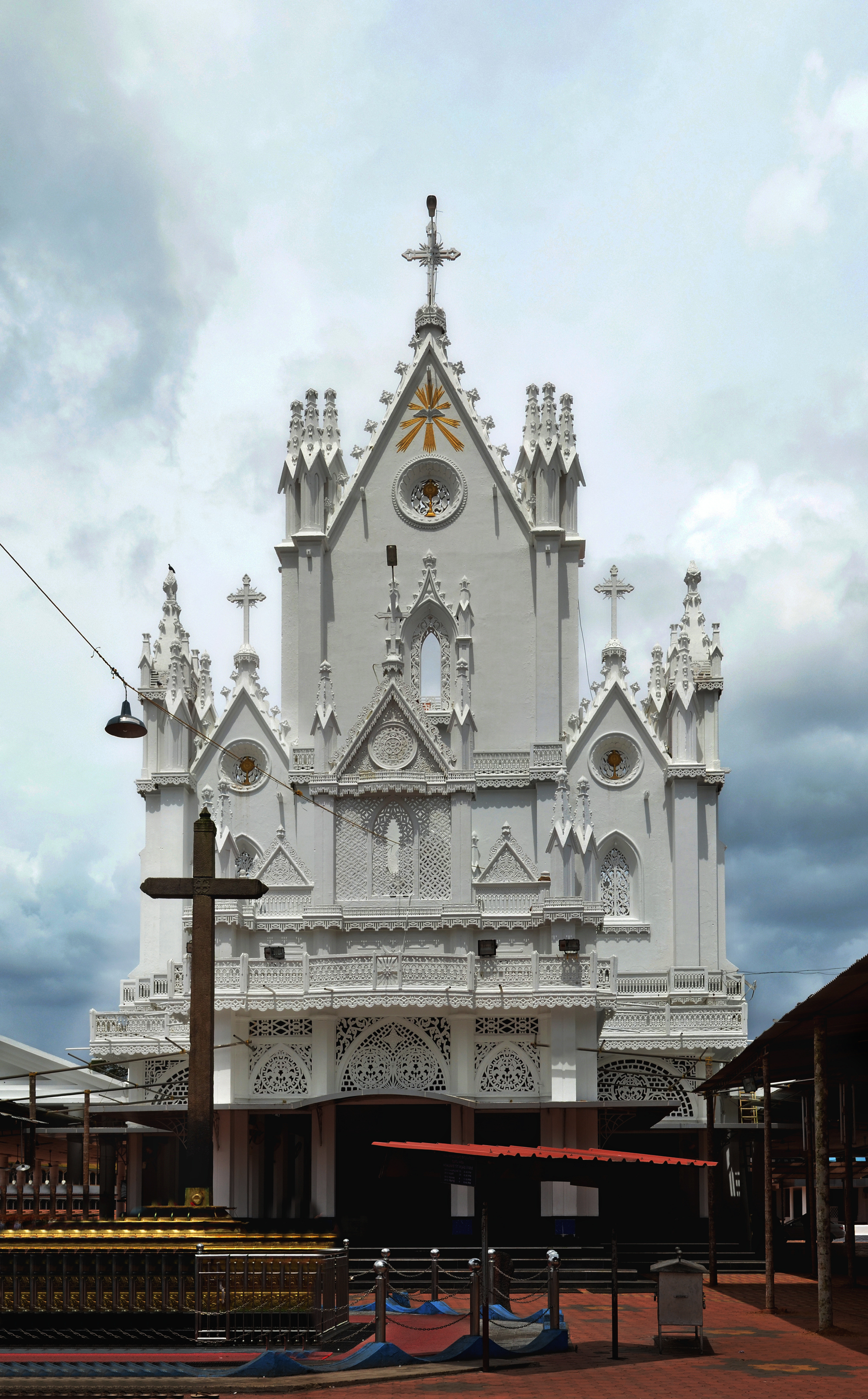
Manarcad Church is one of the oldest churches as well as a popular pilgrim site in India.

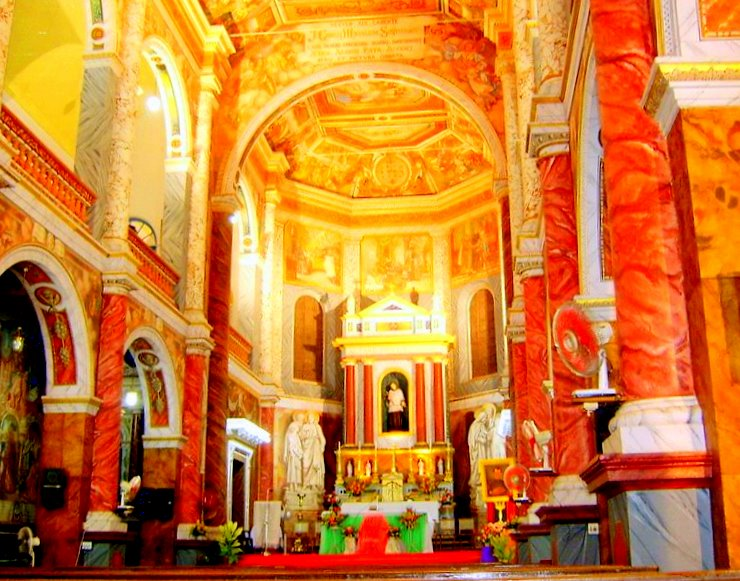
Interior of the St. Aloysius Chapel in Mangalore, an example of Indo-Baroque

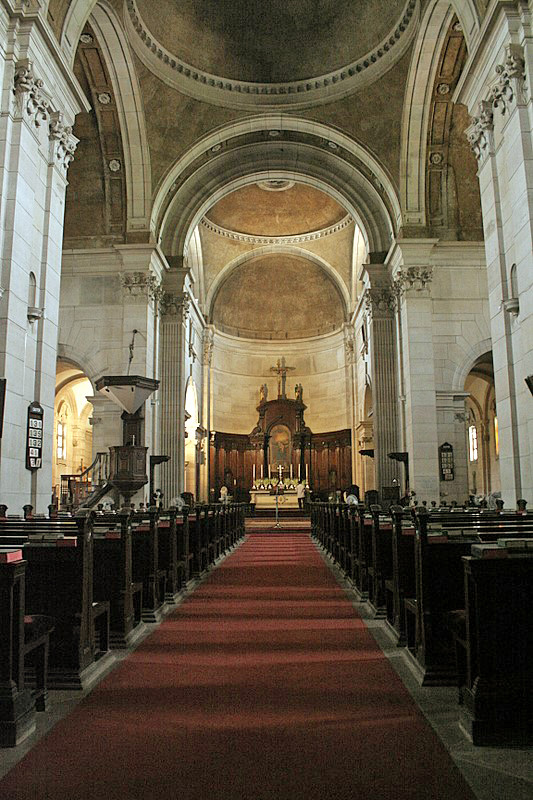
Interior of the CNI Cathedral Church of Redemption, New Delhi, a fine example of the Indo-Saracenic architectureal style

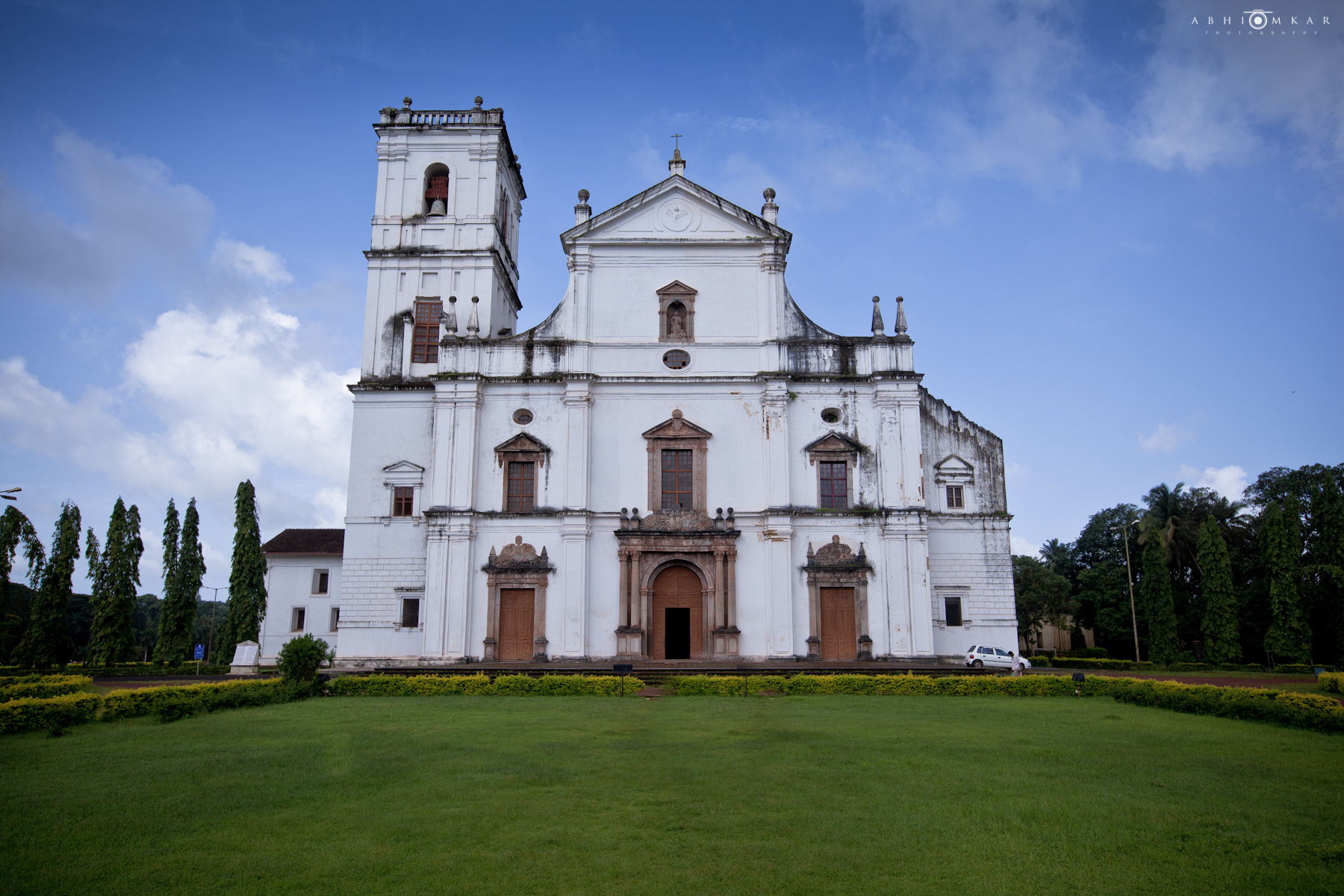
Built in 1562, Se Cathedral is an example of the Portuguese-Manueline style of architecture.

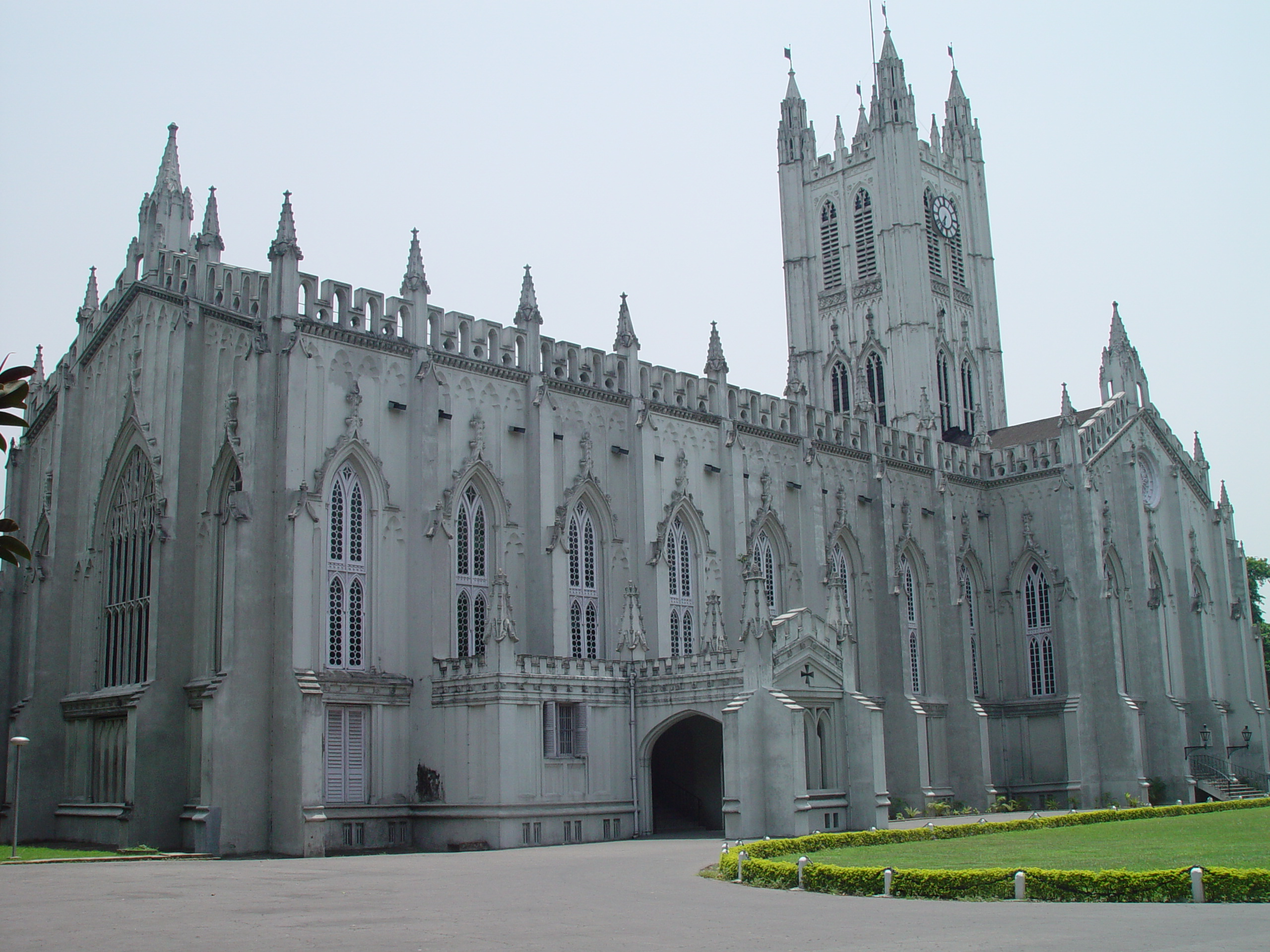
St. Paul's CNI Cathedral, Calcutta is one of the finest examples of Gothic Revival architecture in India.

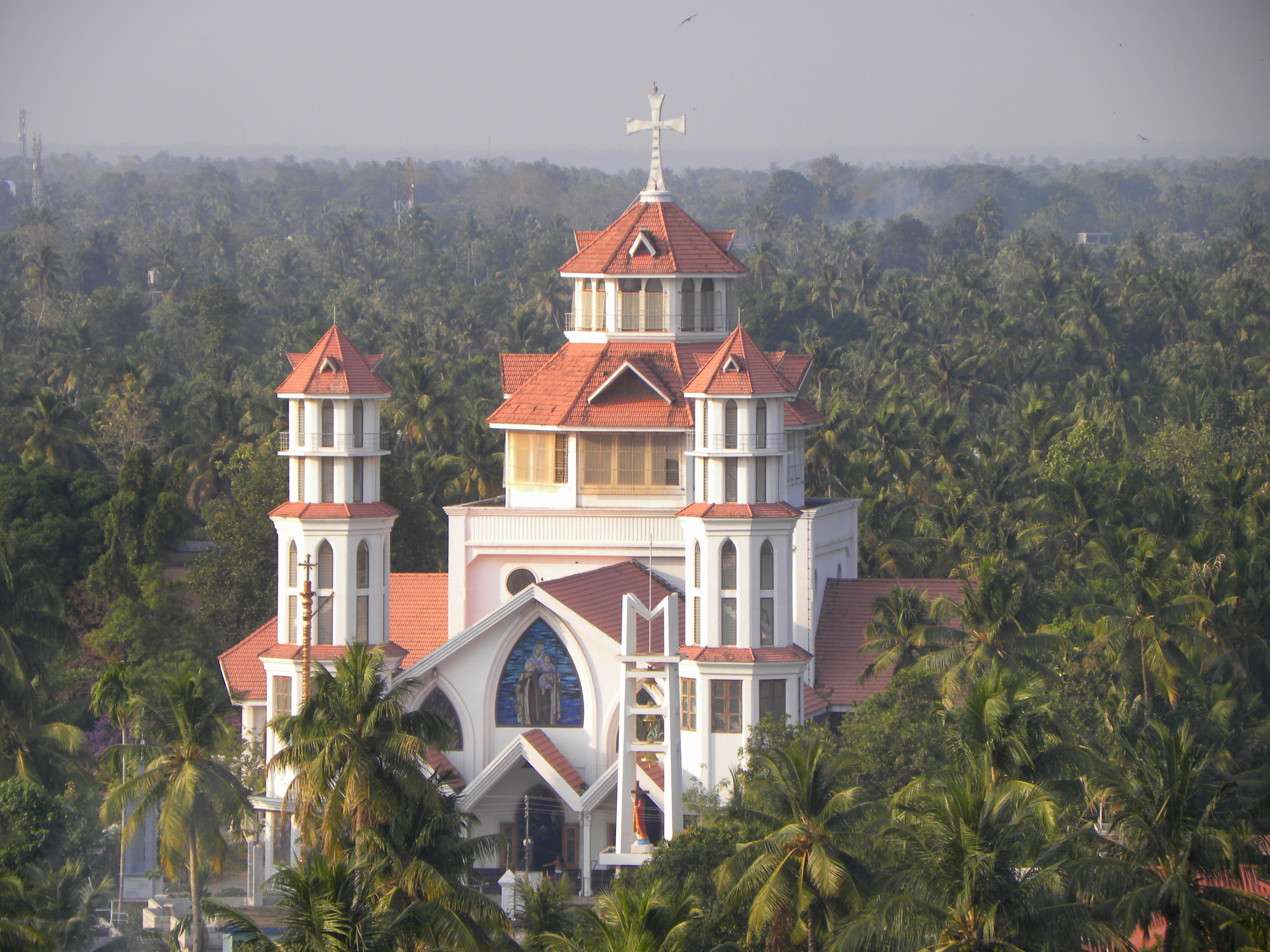
Infant Jesus Cathedral in Kollam city is an example of modern church architecture in India.

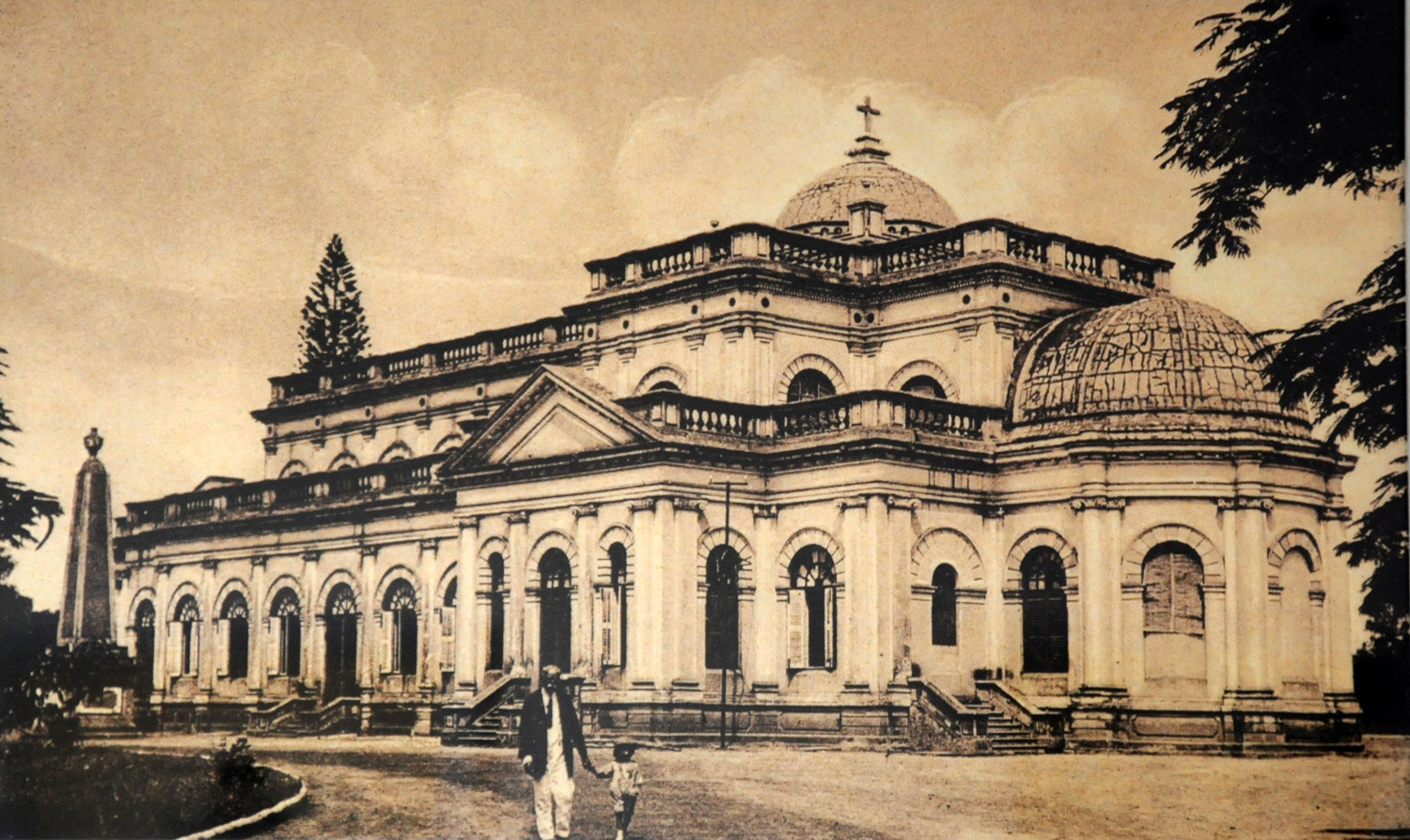
St. Mark's Cathedral, Bangalore is an example of the English Baroque style in India.

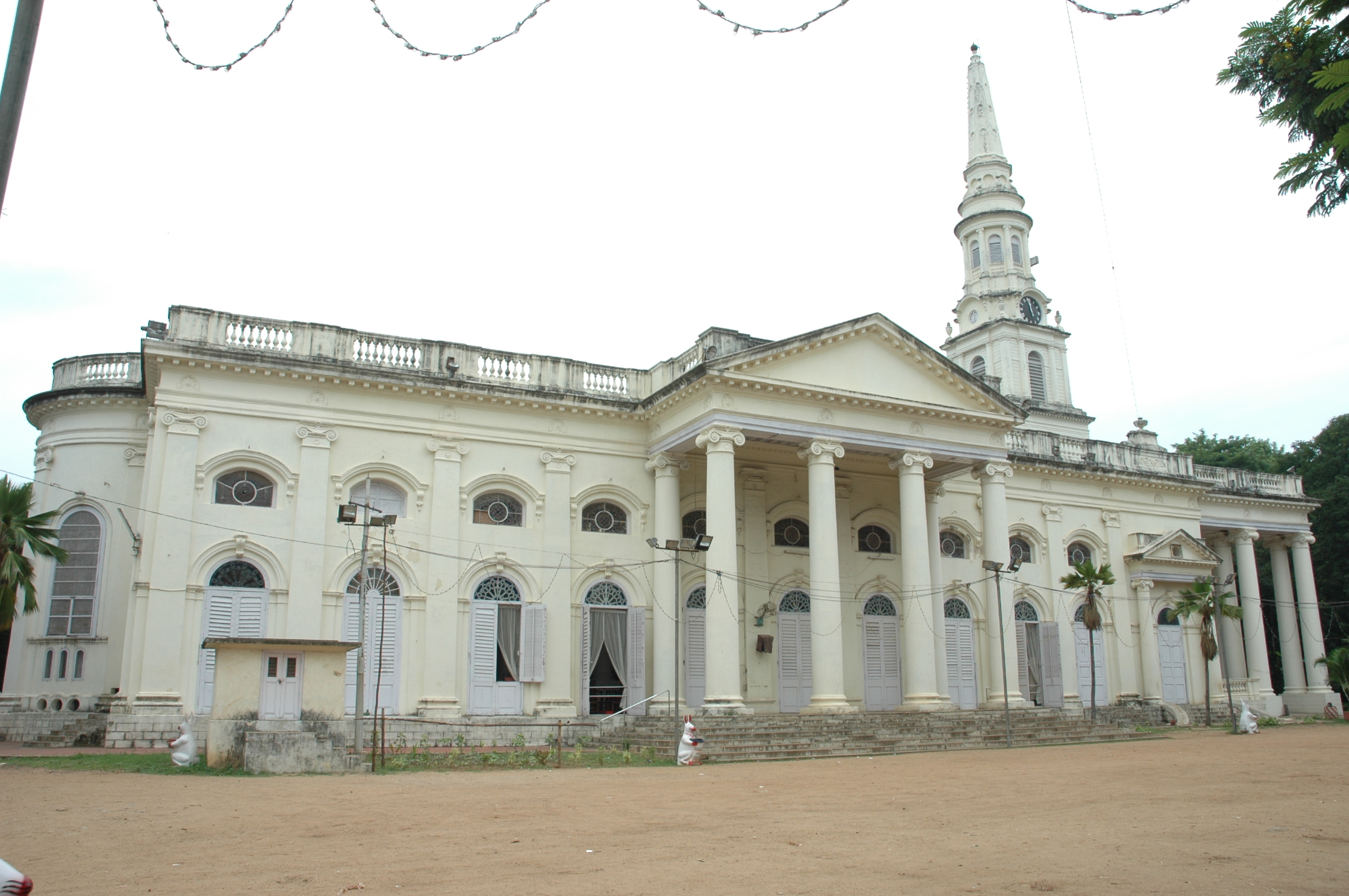
Church of South India Cathedral of St. George, Chennai is an example of the Neoclassical style.

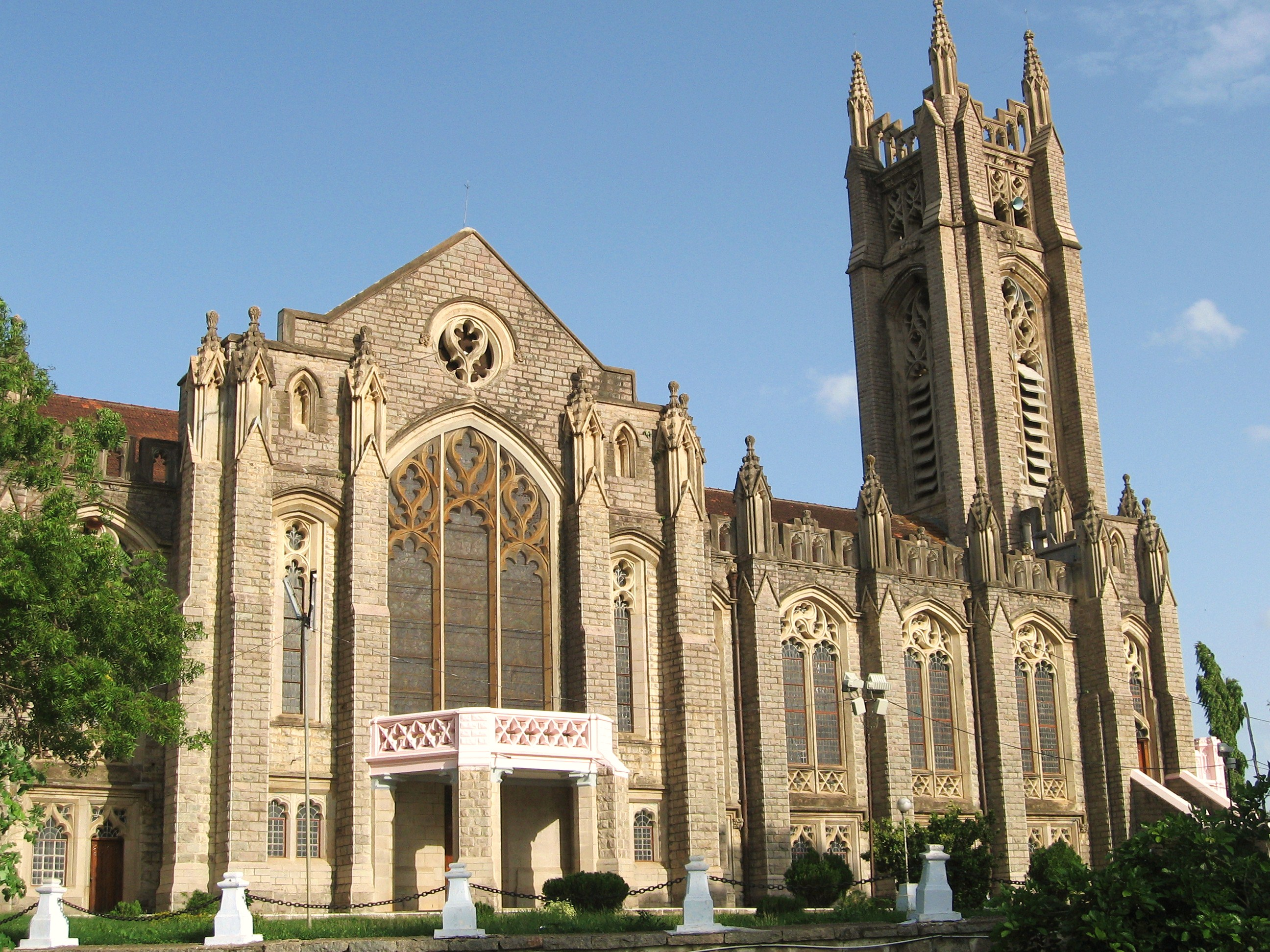
The Gothic Revival style Medak Cathedral is one of the largest churches in Asia.

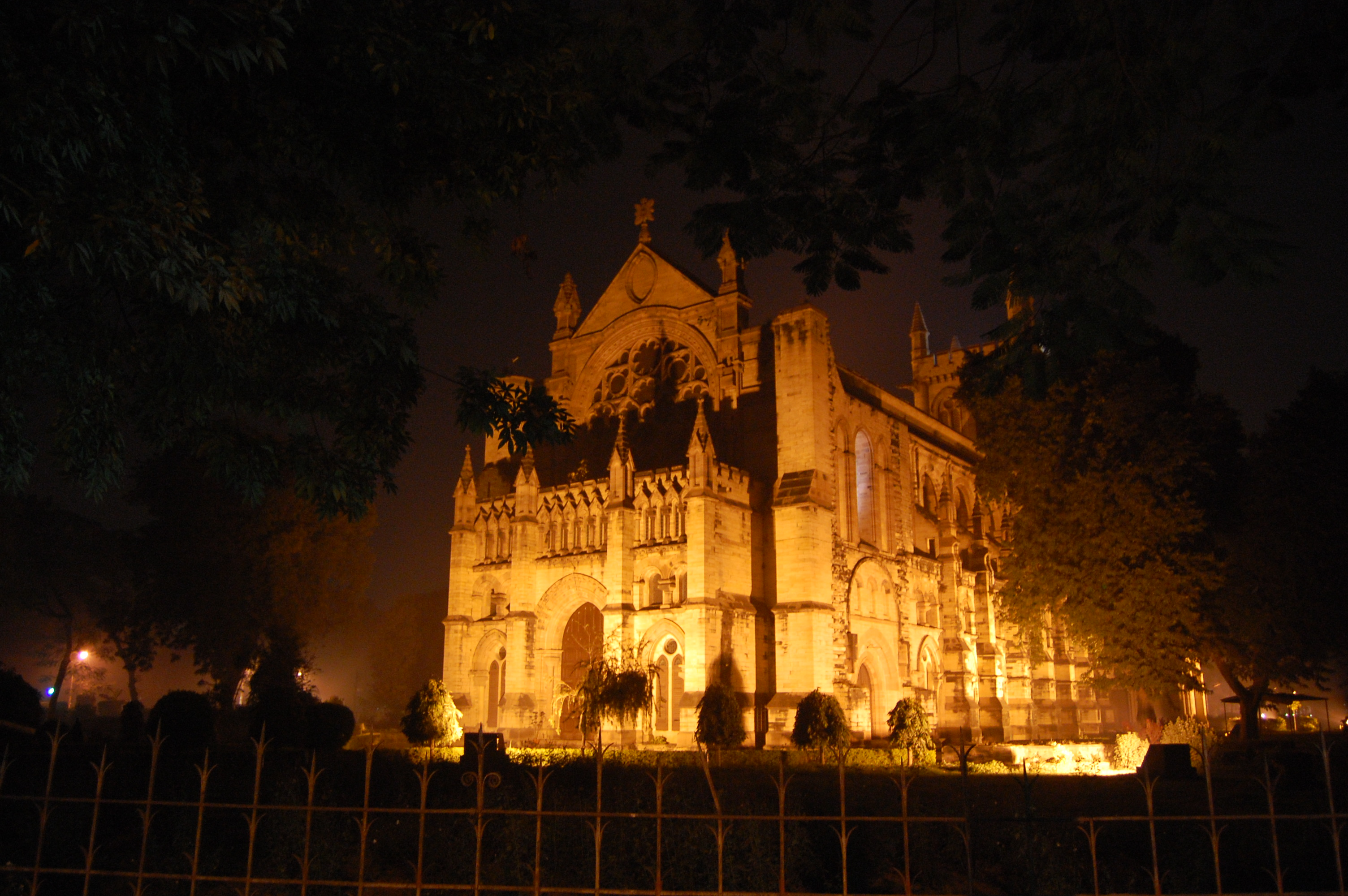
The Gothic Revival style All Saints Cathedral, Allahabad illuminated at night

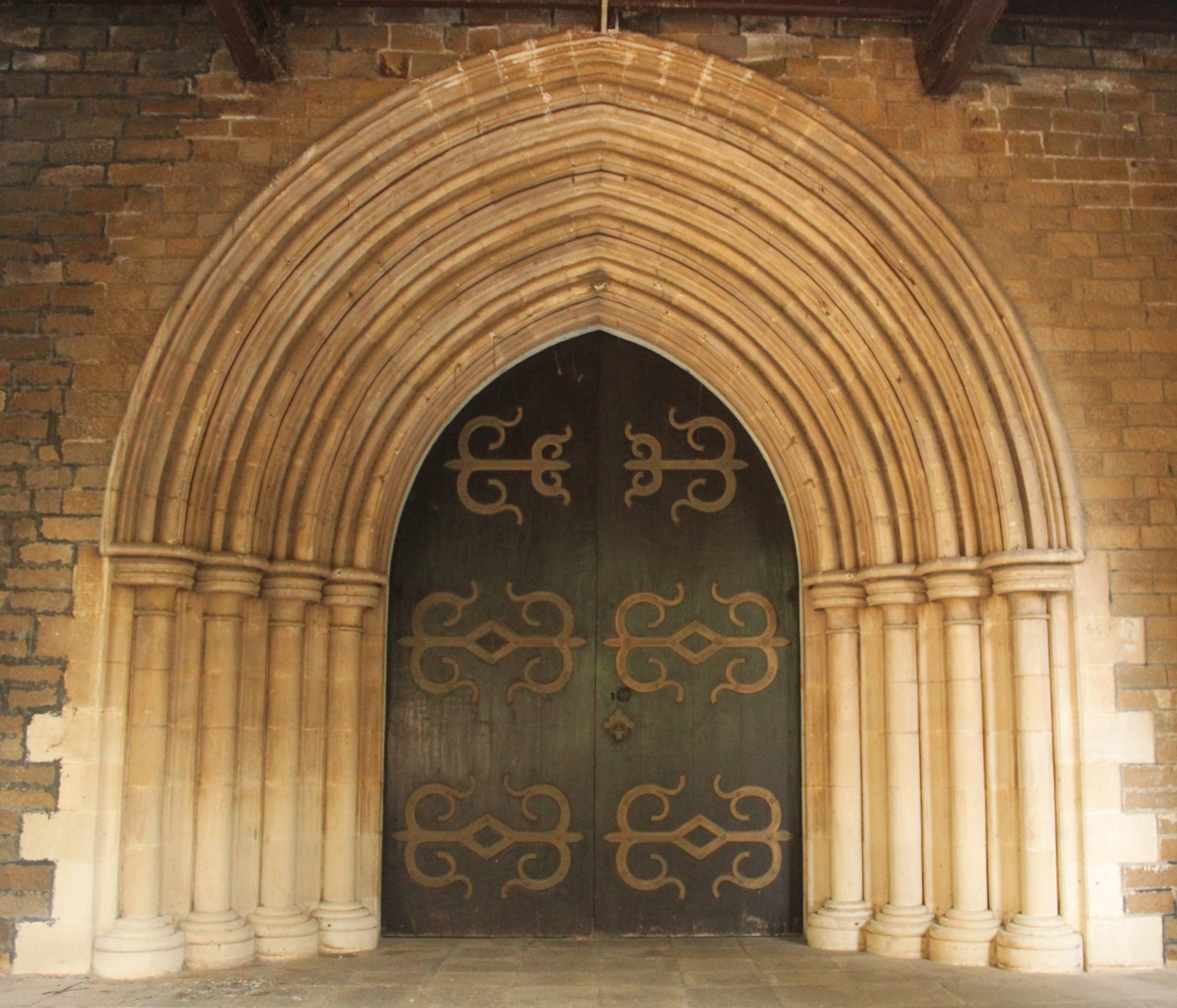
Buff-coloured basalt and limestone doorway to the CNI Afghan Church

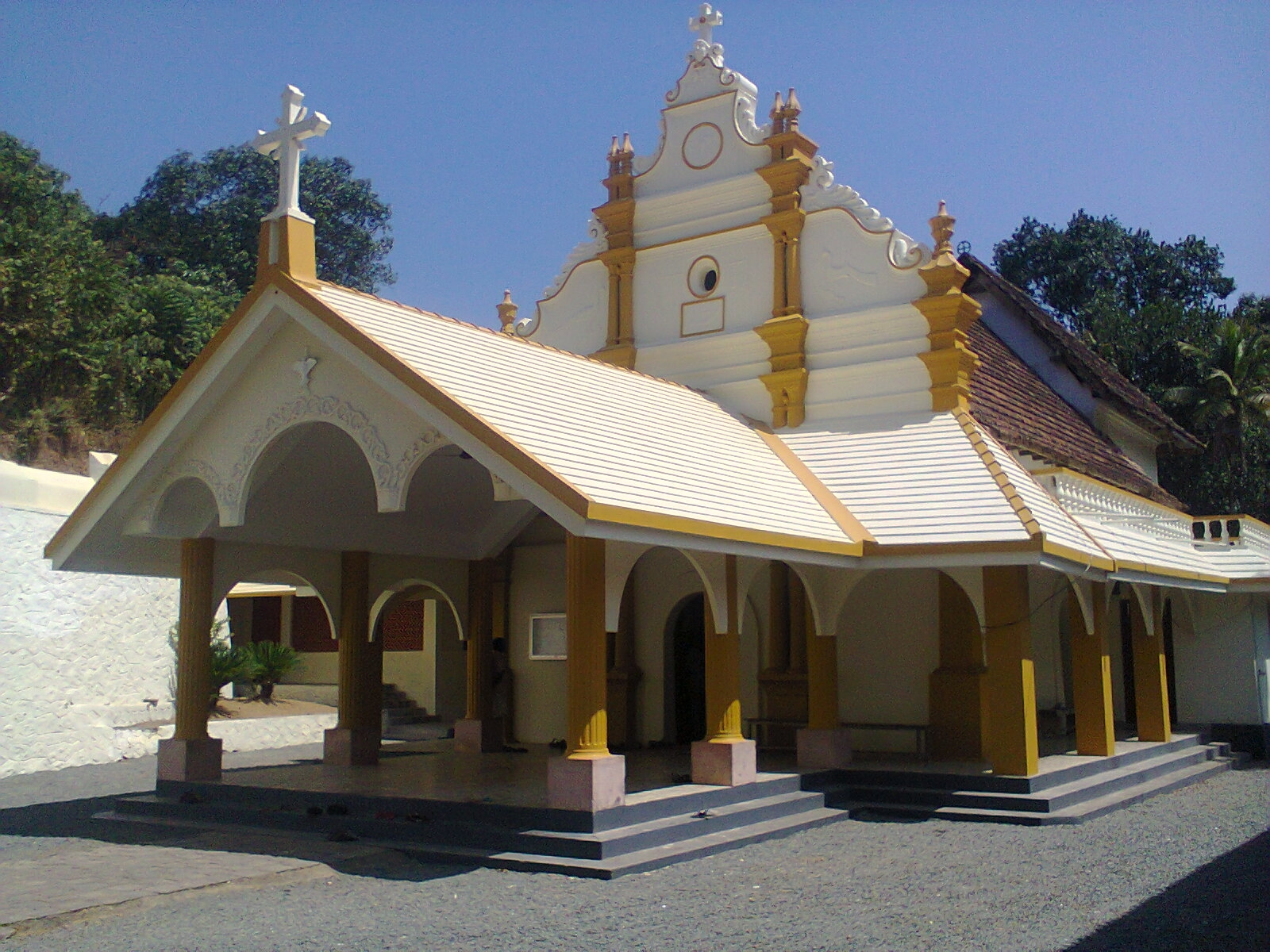
Vadayaparambu Mar Bahanans Church, built in the traditional style of the Malankara Orthodox Church

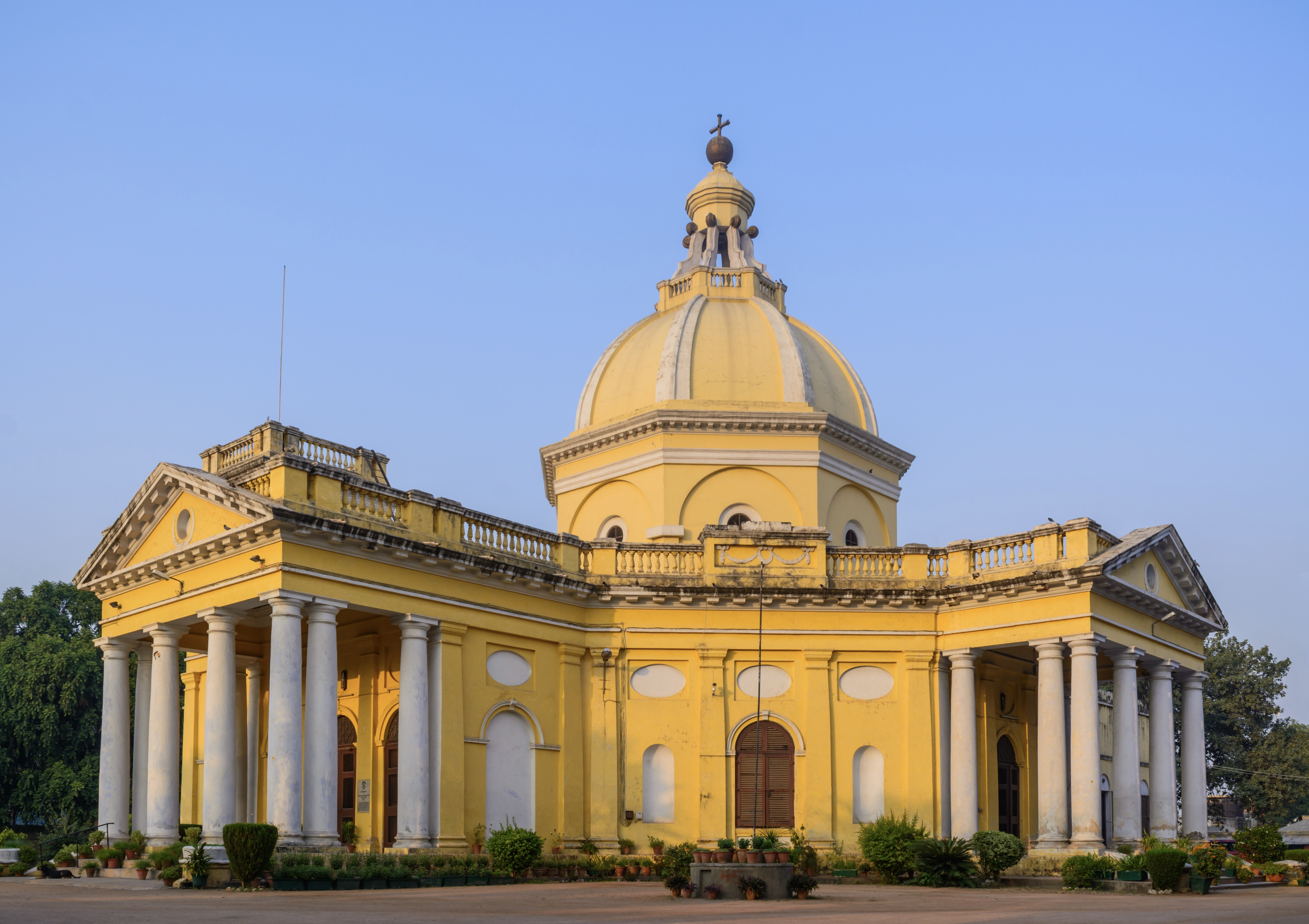
St. James' Church, Delhi, built on a Greek cruciform plan, is an example of the Renaissance Revival style in India.

Kerala Christians have a unique tradition of photographing funerals.

== Culture ==
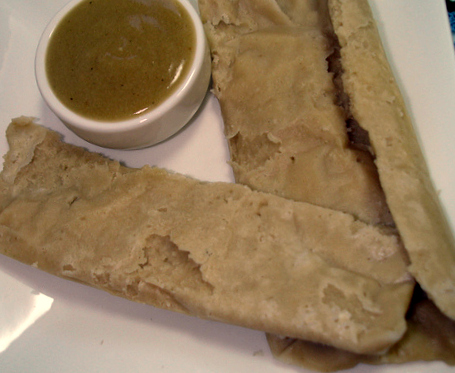
Pesaha Appam is an unleavened Passover bread made by the Saint Thomas Christians of Kerala to be served on Passover night.

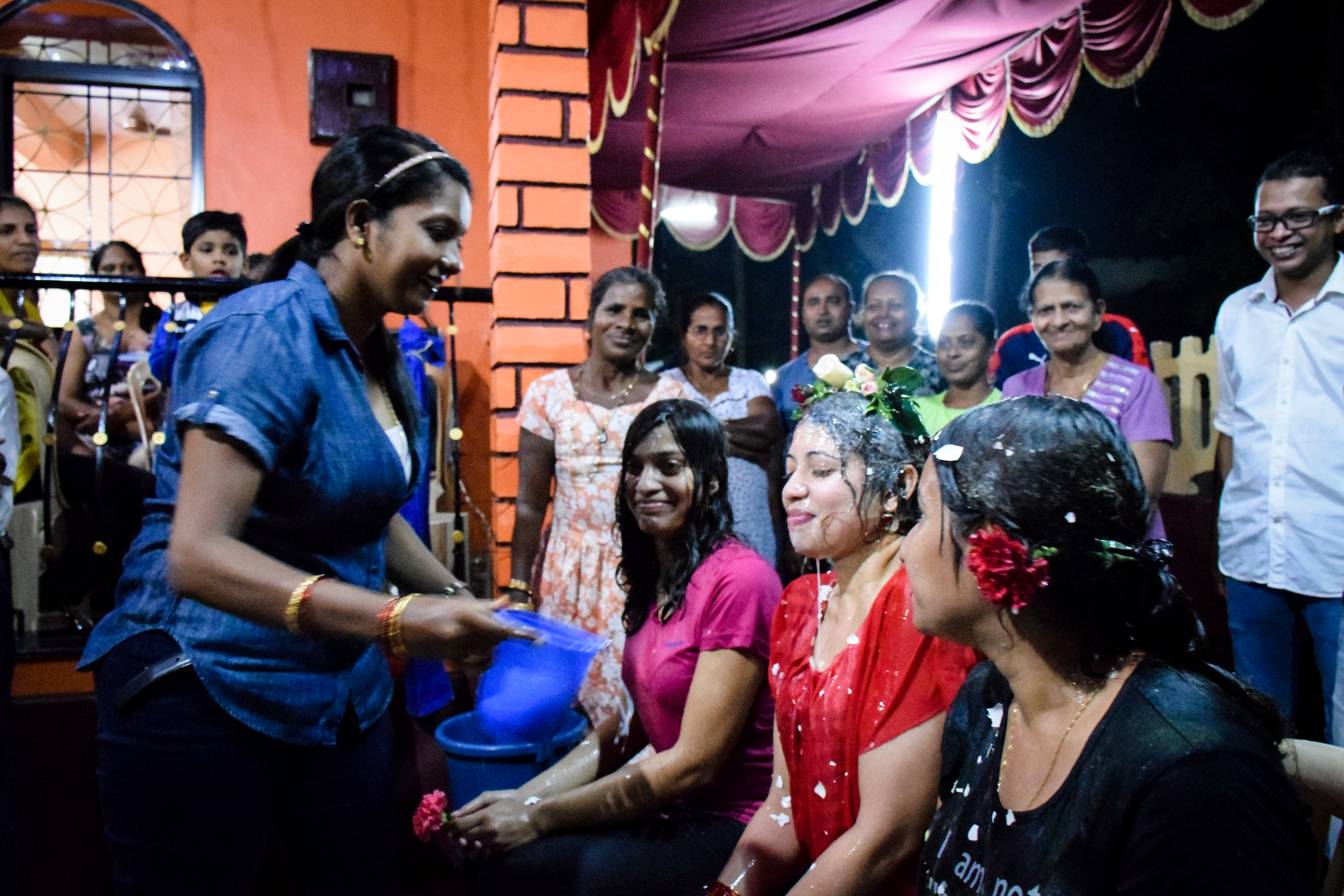
Traditional pre-wedding Goan Catholic Ros ceremony

While Christians in India do not share one common culture, their cultures for the most part tend to be a blend of Indian, Syrian and European cultures. Indian Christian culture varies depending on ethnicity or the first language and as it differs from one region to another. Cultural customs and values also differ among Indian Christians based on the prevailing liturgical rite and the extent of time for which Christianity has existed in those regions. The ancient Saint Thomas Christians of Kerala have a distinctively different culture when compared to Christians in other parts of the country. Historical ties with the Church of the East and assimilation of Indian culture have contributed to the development of a unique subculture among Syrian Christians or Nasranis of Kerala. The use of ornamental umbrellas for Christian religious festivities illustrates an example of the indigenous character of Kerala's Syriac Christianity. The Malankara Nasranis (Thomasine Christians) have a unique Syro-Malabarese culture which includes Christianised Jewish elements, along with Hindu influences.

As a result of the Christianisation of Goa by the Portuguese in the 16th century AD, Goan Catholics have adopted a more Western culture. The dance, song and cuisine of Goa has been greatly influenced by the Portuguese. The culture of Goan Catholics is a mix of Portuguese and Konkani cultures, with the former having a more dominant role because the Portuguese ruled Goa directly from 1510 to 1961. Mangalorean Catholic Christians, who are mainly migrants from the Konkan region to the Canara subregion of Carnataca, have developed a distinct Mangalorean Catholic culture. Christianity in Tamil Nadu, to a certain extent is shaped by the former Danish presence in Tranquebar.

Contemporary Christian culture in India also draws greatly from English culture, as a result of the influence and dominance of former British Indian rule, this is evident in the culture of Bombay East Indian Christians, who were the first subjects of English rule, in the erstwhile Seven Islands of Bombay and the adjacent areas of North Konkan. The Book of Common Prayer is a widely used supplement for worship in the two major Anglican Protestant denominations: Church of South India and Church of North India. Today Christians are considered to be one of the most progressive communities in India. Urban Christians are to a greater extent influenced by European culture, which is considered an advantage in the business environment of urban India; this is given as an explanation for the large number of Christian professionals in India's corporate sector. Christians run thousands of educational institutions, which have contributed to the strengthening of Christian culture in India.

Religion plays a significant role in the daily life of Indian Christians, India ranks 15 among countries with based on church attendance. Religious processions and carnivals are often celebrated by Indian Catholic Christians. Cities with significant Christian populations celebrate patron saint days. As in other parts of the world, Christmas is the most important festival for Indian Christians. Anglo-Indian Christmas balls held in most major cities form a distinctive part of Indian Christian culture. Great Friday is a national holiday, All Souls Day is another holiday that is observed by most Christians in India. Most Protestant churches celebrate harvest festivals, usually in late October or early November. Easter and All Saints Day are also observed by many.

Christian weddings in India conform to the white wedding. However, some Christian brides in the south, wear a white sari instead of a white dress (gown). Prior to the 1960s, the dhothi was worn by South Canarese Christian bridegrooms to their Church weddings; it has almost completely been replaced by the black suit and tie nowadays. Elements and influences of Judaeo-Christian culture or western culture, can also be seen in urbanised or modernised Hindus, particularly among Hindu men during weddings, as more and more Hindu grooms, are choosing to wear two-piece suits instead of dhotis.

== Demographics ==
Christian population in India by census:
| Year | Pop. | ±% |
|---|---|---|
| 1951 | 8,305,000 | — |
| 1961 | 10,729,000 | +29.2% |
| 1971 | 14,225,000 | +32.6% |
| 1981 | 16,650,000 | +17.0% |
| 1991 | 19,455,000 | +16.8% |
| 2001 | 24,080,016 | +23.8% |
| 2011 | 27,819,588 | +15.5% |

The 2001 census of India recorded 24,080,016 Christians in the country, representing 2.34 per cent of the population. A majority of Indian Christians are Protestants, followed by Catholics and Oriental Orthodox etc.

=== Population by states ===
Distribution of Christian population in different Indian states

Christianity is the predominant religion in the northeastern states of Nagaland, Mizoram, Meghalaya, and Manipur. There are also substantial Christian populations in the regions of Arunachal, Assam, Tripura, Andhra Pradesh, Karnataka, Kerala, Tamil Nadu, Goa, Jharkhand and the Andaman and Nicobar Islands. The Christian population of Bombay (Mumbai) area, is above the national average of 2.3 percent and found to be at 3.45 percent according to the 2011 census.

States with Christian majority or plurality in India as per 2011 census
| States | Christian population | Percentage (%) | Status |
|---|---|---|---|
| Kerala | 6,141,269 | 18.38 | "Significant" |
| Meghalaya | 2,213,027 | 74.59 | "Majority" |
| Nagaland | 1,739,651 | 87.93 | "Majority" |
| Manipur | 1,179,043 | 41.29 | "Plurality" |
| Mizoram | 956,331 | 87.16 | "Majority" |
| Arunachal Pradesh | 418,732 | 30.26 | "Plurality" |
| Goa | 366,130 | 25.10 | "Significant" |

The native majority of Goa is Christian. According to the 1909 statistics in the Catholic Encyclopedia, the total Christian population in Portuguese controlled Goa was 293,628 out of a total population of 365,291 (80.33%). Due to emigration of natives (mostly Goan Catholics) from Goa to cosmopolitan cities in India (Mumbai, Bangalore, etc.) and to foreign countries, as well as mass migration of non-Christians to Goa from other states of India since the 20th century, the demographics of Goa have been severely altered. Less than 50% of Indian residents in Goa are ethnic Goans. The census of India provides us with the official numbers for Christian population in India. The Indian census has been recorded every ten years since 1871 and has always included religion (along with population, race, rural distribution, and occupation, among others). The most recently published census is from 2011. Subsequent estimates from 2013, 2015, 2017 and 2019 are also considered reliable.

State/Union Territory-wise Christian population, 2011 census of India
| State/UT | Total population | Christian population | | | ST Christian population | |
| State/UT | Total population | Number | % of India | % of State | Number | % of State Christian |
|---|---|---|---|---|---|---|
| India | 1,210,854,977 | 27,819,588 | 100 | 2.30 | 10,327,052 | 37.12 |
| Andhra Pradesh | 84,580,777 | 1,129,784 | 4.06 | 1.34 | 26,512 | 2.35 |
| Arunachal Pradesh | 1,383,727 | 418,732 | 1.51 | 30.26 | 389,507 | 93.02 |
| Assam | 31,205,576 | 1,165,867 | 4.19 | 3.74 | 495,379 | 42.49 |
| Bihar | 104,099,452 | 129,247 | 0.46 | 0.12 | 32,523 | 25.16 |
| Chhattisgarh | 25,545,198 | 490,542 | 1.76 | 1.92 | 385,041 | 78.49 |
| Goa | 1,458,545 | 366,130 | 1.32 | 25.10 | 48,783 | 13.32 |
| Gujarat | 60,439,692 | 316,178 | 1.14 | 0.52 | 120,777 | 38.2 |
| Haryana | 25,351,462 | 50,353 | 0.18 | 0.20 | —N/a | —N/a |
| Himachal Pradesh | 6,864,602 | 12,646 | 0.05 | 0.18 | 275 | 2.17 |
| Jharkhand | 32,988,134 | 1,418,608 | 5.1 | 4.30 | 1,338,175 | 94.33 |
| Karnataka | 61,095,297 | 1,142,647 | 4.11 | 1.87 | 12,811 | 1.12 |
| Kerala | 33,406,061 | 6,141,269 | 22.08 | 18.38 | 32,844 | 0.53 |
| Madhya Pradesh | 72,626,809 | 213,282 | 0.77 | 0.29 | 88,548 | 41.52 |
| Maharashtra | 112,374,333 | 1,080,073 | 3.88 | 0.96 | 20,335 | 1.88 |
| Manipur | 2,855,794 | 1,179,043 | 4.24 | 41.29 | 1,137,318 | 96.46 |
| Meghalaya | 2,966,889 | 2,213,027 | 7.95 | 74.59 | 2,157,887 | 97.51 |
| Mizoram | 1,097,206 | 956,331 | 3.44 | 87.16 | 933,302 | 97.59 |
| Nagaland | 1,978,502 | 1,739,651 | 6.25 | 87.93 | 1,680,424 | 96.6 |
| Odisha | 41,974,218 | 1,161,708 | 4.18 | 2.77 | 816,981 | 70.33 |
| Punjab | 27,743,338 | 348,230 | 1.25 | 1.26 | —N/a | —N/a |
| Rajasthan | 68,548,437 | 96,430 | 0.35 | 0.14 | 25,375 | 26.31 |
| Sikkim | 610,577 | 60,522 | 0.22 | 9.91 | 16,899 | 27.92 |
| Tamil Nadu | 72,147,030 | 4,418,331 | 15.88 | 6.12 | 7,222 | 0.16 |
| Tripura | 3,673,917 | 159,882 | 0.57 | 4.35 | 153,061 | 95.73 |
| Uttar Pradesh | 199,812,341 | 356,448 | 1.28 | 0.18 | 1,011 | 0.28 |
| Uttarakhand | 10,086,292 | 37,781 | 0.14 | 0.37 | 437 | 1.16 |
| West Bengal | 91,276,115 | 658,618 | 2.37 | 0.72 | 343,893 | 52.21 |
| Andaman and Nicobar Islands | 380,581 | 80,984 | 0.29 | 21.28 | 57,280 | 70.73 |
| Chandigarh | 1,055,450 | 8,720 | 0.03 | 0.83 | —N/a | —N/a |
| Dadra and Nagar Haveli | 343,709 | 5,113 | 0.02 | 1.49 | 2,658 | 51.99 |
| Daman and Diu | 243,247 | 2,820 | 0.01 | 1.16 | 16 | 0.57 |
| Delhi | 16,787,941 | 146,093 | 0.53 | 0.87 | —N/a | —N/a |
| Jammu and Kashmir | 12,541,302 | 35,631 | 0.13 | 0.28 | 1,775 | 4.98 |
| Lakshadweep | 64,473 | 317 | 0 | 0.49 | 3 | 0.95 |
| Puducherry | 1,247,953 | 78,550 | 0.28 | 6.29 | —N/a | —N/a |

=== Population by districts ===
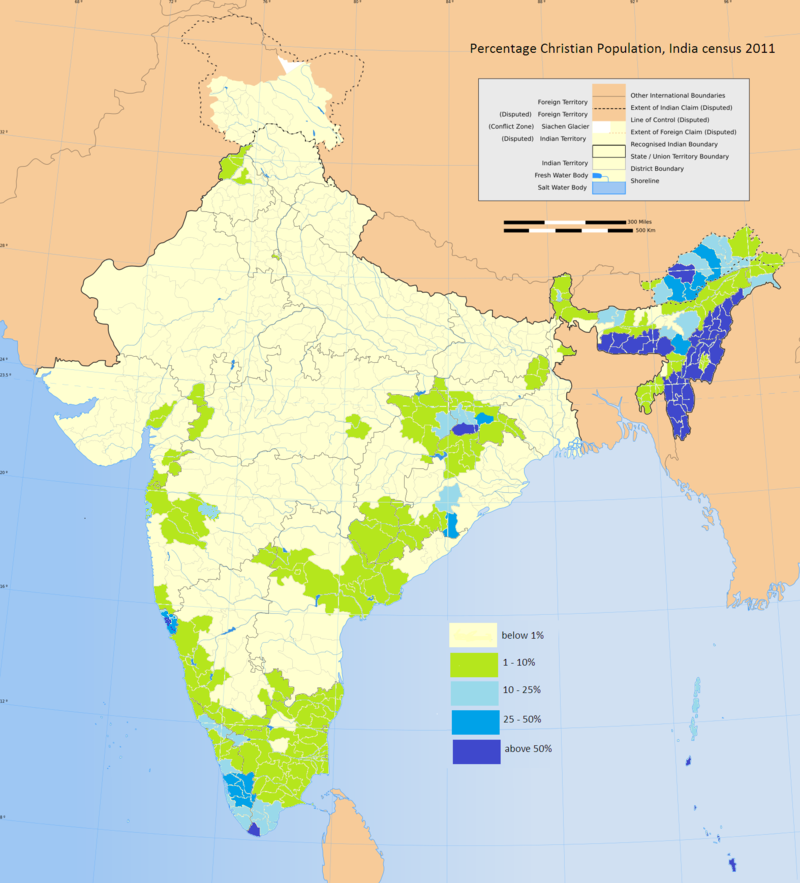
Percentage Christian population by district, India census 2011

During 2011 census, there were 38 christian majority districts in India.

| District | State | Percentage |
|---|---|---|
| Champhai district | Mizoram | 98.17% |
| Serchhip district | Mizoram | 97.70% |
| Saiha district | Mizoram | 97.18% |
| Tuensang district | Nagaland | 97.59% |
| Zunheboto district | Nagaland | 97.33% |
| Saiha district | Mizoram | 97.18% |
| Kiphire district | Nagaland | 97.03% |
| Phek district | Nagaland | 96.82% |
| Longleng district | Nagaland | 96.76% |
| Tamenglong district | Manipur | 95.81% |
| West Khasi Hills district | Meghalaya | 95.68% |
| Wokha district | Nagaland | 95.13% |
| Aizawl district | Mizoram | 94.71% |
| Ukhrul district | Manipur | 94.63% |
| Mon district | Nagaland | 94.5% |
| Mokokchung district | Nagaland | 93.44% |
| South Garo Hills district | Meghalaya | 93.43% |
| Churachandpur district | Manipur | 93.01% |
| East Garo Hills district | Meghalaya | 91.13% |
| Peren district | Nagaland | 90.47% |
| Kolasib district | Mizoram | 89.58% |
| Chandel district | Manipur | 89.50% |
| Senapati district | Manipur | 89.08% |
| Kohima district | Nagaland | 87.67% |
| Ri Bhoi district | Meghalaya | 84.42% |
| Mamit district | Mizoram | 80.01% |
| Lunglei district | Mizoram | 78.75% |
| Tirap district | Arunachal Pradesh | 74.45% |
| Nicobar district | Andaman and Nicobar Islands | 70.78% |
| Jaintia Hills district | Meghalaya | 68.74% |
| East Khasi Hills district | Meghalaya | 65.79% |
| Dimapur district | Nagaland | 61.84% |
| West Garo Hills district | Meghalaya | 60.62% |
| Kurung Kumey district | Arunachal Pradesh | 55.59% |
| Lawngtlai district | Mizoram | 54.19% |
| Simdega district | Jharkhand | 51.14% |
| Papum Pare district | Arunachal Pradesh | 47.80% |
| East Kameng district | Arunachal Pradesh | 47.19% |

There were also 11 districts where christians form more than 25% of the total population.

| District | State | Percentage |
|---|---|---|
| Kanyakumari district | Tamilnadu | 46.85% |
| Kottayam district | Kerala | 43.48% |
| Idukki district | Kerala | 43.42% |
| Lower Subansiri district | Arunachal Pradesh | 41.43% |
| Pathanamthitta district | Kerala | 38.12% |
| Ernakulam district | Kerala | 38.03% |
| Gajapati district | Odisha | 38.00% |
| South Goa district | Goa | 36.21% |
| Dima Hasao district | Assam | 29.57% |
| West Siang district | Arunachal Pradesh | 26.69% |
| Khunti district | Jharkhand | 25.65% |

=== Population by groups ===
Distribution of population of each religion by caste as reported by the Sachar Committee on Muslim Affairs in 2006
| Religion | SC | ST | OBC | Forward Class |
|---|---|---|---|---|
| Buddhism | 89.5% | 7.4% | 0.4% | 2.7% |
| Sikhism | 30.7% | 0.9% | 22.4% | 46.1% |
| Hinduism | 22.2% | 9.1% | 42.8% | 26.0% |
| Christianity | 9.0% | 32.8% | 24.8% | 33.3% |
| Islam | 0.8% | 0.5% | 39.2% | 59.5% |
| Jainism | 0.0% | 2.6% | 3.0% | 94.3% |
| Zoroastrianism | 0.0% | 15.9% | 13.7% | 70.4% |
| Others | 2.6% | 82.5% | 6.2% | 8.7% |
| Total | 19.7% | 8.5% | 41.1% | 30.8% |

Social background of Christians in India (Pew Research)
1. De facto Scheduled Castes (33.0%)
2. Scheduled Tribes (24.0%)
3. Other backward groups (17.0%)
4. Other (26.0%)

According to Pew Research, 74% of Christians in India belong to disadvantaged social groups, largely concentrated in the South, East, and Northeast. This includes 33% belonging to Scheduled Castes (a.k.a. Dalit Christian), mostly in South India, and 24% to Scheduled Tribes, mainly in the East and Northeast A 2015 study estimates some 40,000 Christian believers from a Muslim background in the country, most of them belonging to Protestantism.

=== Population by denomination ===
Relative size of Christian traditions in India, according to Pew Research Center's analysis of 2011 Indian census.
1. Protestant (59.2%)
2. Catholic (33.2%)
3. Oriental Orthodox (7.44%)
4. Others (0.15%)

In 2011, Pew reported 18,860,000 Protestants, 10,570,000 Catholics, 2,370,000 Oriental Orthodox and 50,000 other Christians in India. Other sources estimate the total number of Protestants throughout the country in several hundreds of denominations at 45 million (45 million). Several sources estimate Catholic population in India at over 17 million (1.7 crore) The largest single denomination is the Catholic Church. Anglicans within the united Church of North India and Church of South India, constitute the second largest group at about 6.7 million (6.7 million). The Malankara Mar Thoma Syrian Church is an Eastern Protestant denomination with 1.1 million members in full communion with the Anglican Communion.

==== Catholic denominations ====
The Saint Thomas Christians (Syro Malabar Church, Syro-Malankara Catholic Church, Malankara Orthodox Syrian Church, Jacobite Syrian Christian Church, Chaldean Syrian Church, CSI Syrian Christians, Mar Thoma Syrian Church, Pentecostal Syrian Christians, St. Thomas Evangelical Church and Malabar Independent Syrian Church) of Kerala form 18.75% of the Christians in India with 4.5 million of them. 310,000 were members of the Syro-Malankara Church and 4,000,000 of the Syro-Malabar Church. In January 1993, the Syro-Malabar Church and in February 2005, the Syro-Malankara Church were raised to the status of major archiepiscopal churches by Pope John Paul II. The Syro-Malabar Church is the second largest among the 23 Eastern Catholic Churches who accept the Pope as the visible head of the whole church.

==== Oriental Orthodox denominations ====
The Oriental Orthodox churches in India include the Malankara Orthodox Syrian Church with 1,120,000 members, the Jacobite Syrian Christian Church with 800,000 members and the Malabar Independent Syrian Church with 30,000 members.

==== Protestant denominations ====
Most Protestant denominations are represented in India, as a result of missionary activities throughout the country, such as the American Missionary Association, the Society for the Propagation of the Gospel Mission, the Church Mission Society of the Church of England and many other missions from Europe, America and Australia. In 1961, an evangelical wing of the Mar Thoma Church split and formed the St. Thomas Evangelical Church of India which has 35,000 members. There are about 1,267,786 Lutherans, 648,000 Methodists, 2,392,694 Baptists, and 823,456 Presbyterians in India.

The Open Brethren movement is also significantly represented in India. The main Brethren grouping is known as the Indian Brethren (with a following estimated at somewhere between 449,550 and 1,000,000), of which the Kerala Brethren are a significant subset. The closely related Assemblies Jehovah Shammah have around 310,000 adults and children in fellowship as of 2010. They are often considered part of the wider Brethren movement, although they were founded by an indigenous evangelist (Bakht Singh) and developed independently of the older Indian Brethren movement, which originated from missionary endeavours.

Pentecostalism is also a rapidly growing movement in India. The major Pentecostal churches in India are the Indian Pentecostal Church of God, the Assemblies of God, The Pentecostal Mission, the New Apostolic Church with 1,448,209 members, the New Life Fellowship Association with 480,000 members, the Manna Full Gospel Churches with 275,000 members, and the Evangelical Church of India with 250,000 members.

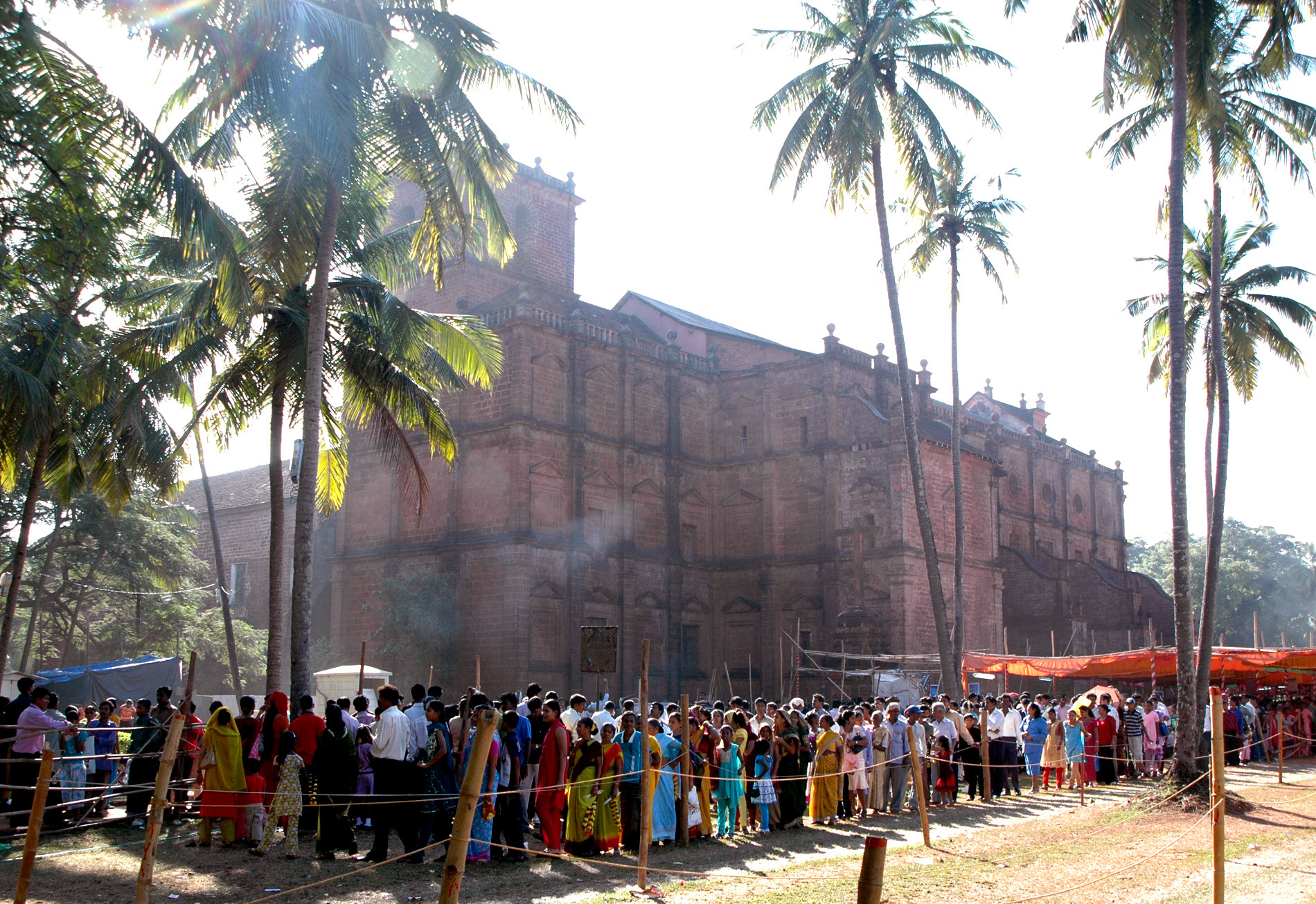
Goan Catholics celebrating the feast of Saint Francis Xavier

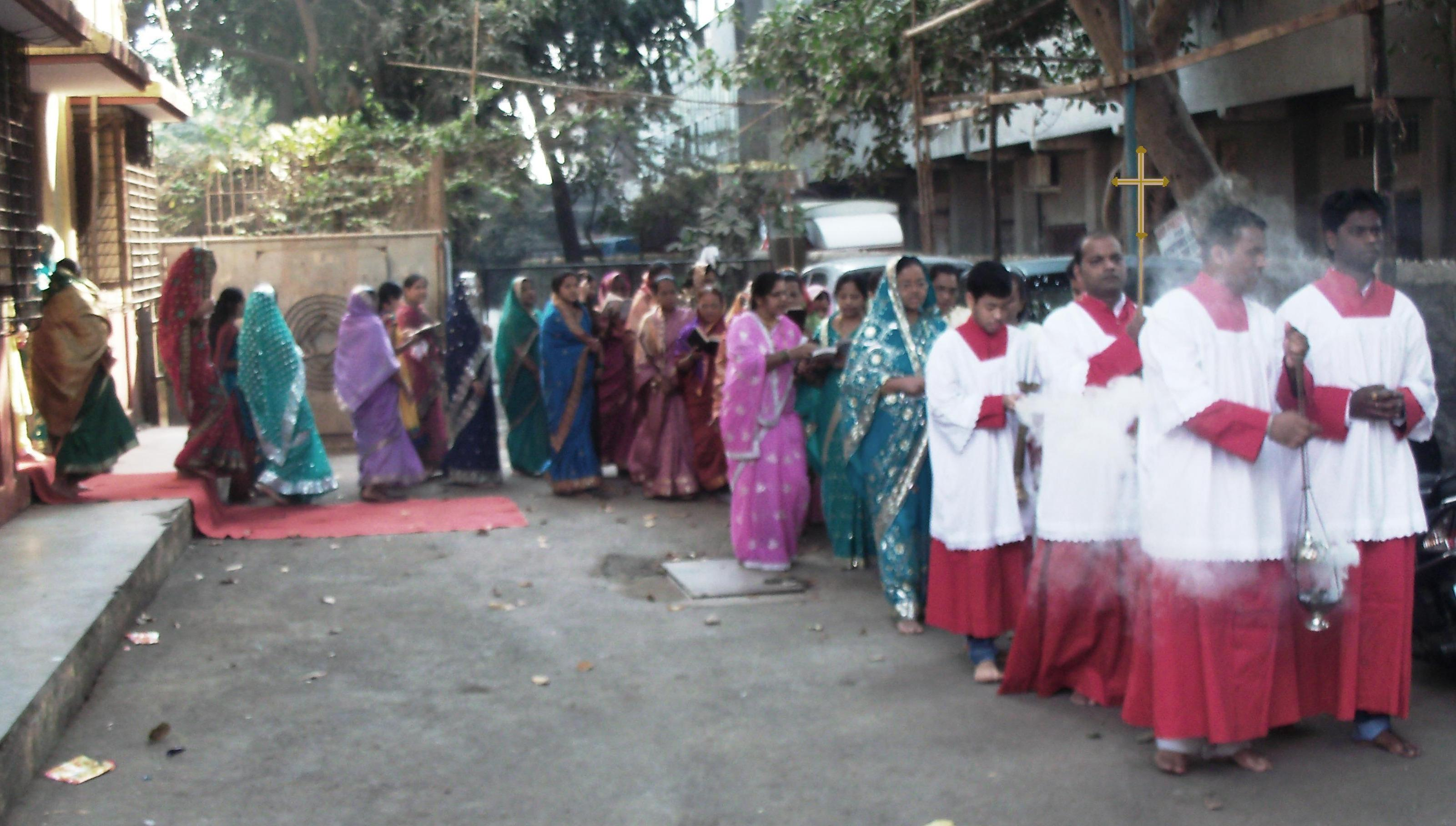
Marathi Anglicans in Mumbai

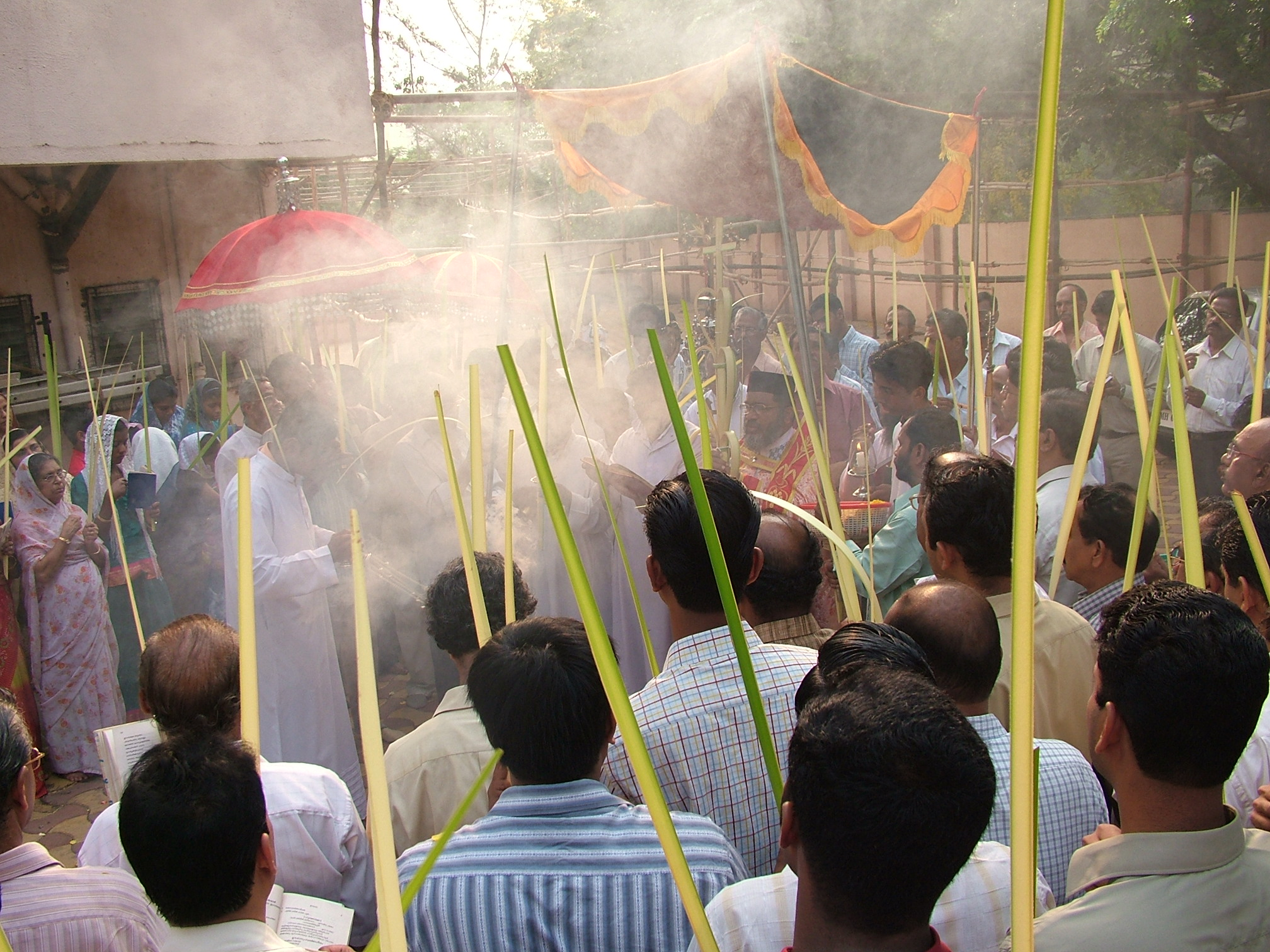
Oriental Orthodox Christians celebrating Palm Sunday

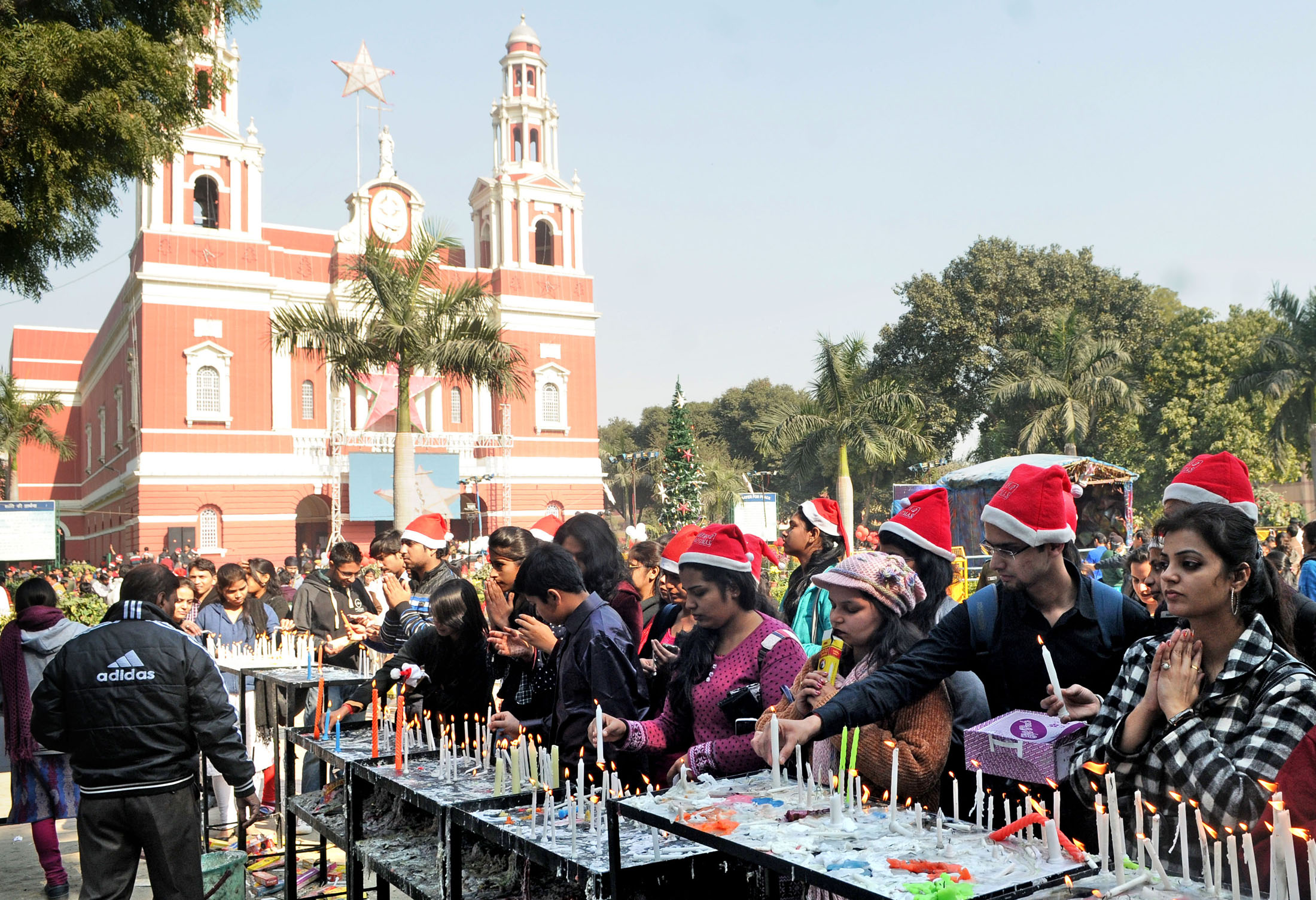
Devotees light candles and pray outside the Sacred Heart Cathedral, New Delhi on the occasion of Christmas.

==== List ====
Christian denominations in India
| Church name | Population | Orientation |
|---|---|---|
| Latin Church ("Roman Catholic" Church) | 11,800,000 | Catholic Church, Latin rite |
| Syro-Malabar Catholic Church | 4,000,000 | Catholic Church, East Syriac Rite |
| Syro-Malankara Catholic Church | 410,000 | Catholic Church, West Syriac Rite |
| Malankara Orthodox Syrian Church | 1,600,000 | Oriental Orthodox, West Syriac Rite |
| Jacobite Syrian Orthodox Church | 1,200,000 | Oriental Orthodox, West Syriac Rite (Syriac Orthodox Church of Antioch) |
| Malankara Mar Thoma Syrian Church | 1,100,000 | Independent and Eastern Protestant Christian, Reformed West Syriac Rite |
| Malabar Independent Syrian Church | 20,000 | Independent, West Syriac Rite |
| Chaldean Syrian Church | 35,000 | Church of the East, East Syriac rite |
| Nagaland Baptist Church Council | 687,442 | Protestant (Baptist) |
| St. Thomas Evangelical Church of India | 35,000 | Episcopalian Protestant |
| Church of South India | 4,500,000 | Anglican (United and uniting) |
| Church of North India | 2,200,000 | Anglican (United and uniting) |
| Methodist Church in India | 648,000 | Protestant |
| India Pentecostal Church of God | 2,600,000 | Protestant Evangelical Pentecostal |
| Assemblies of God in India | 5,000,000 | Protestant Evangelical Pentecostal |
| United Pentecostal Church in India | 105,000 | Protestant Evangelical Pentecostal |
| The Pentecostal Mission | 700,000 | Protestant |
| Baptist | 2,991,276 | Protestant (List of Baptist denominations in India) |
| Assemblies Jehovah Shammah | 310,000 | Protestant (Plymouth Brethren) |
| Lutheran | 4,220,178 | Protestant (List of Lutheran Denominations Worldwide) |
| Jeypore Evangelical Lutheran Church (JELC) | 250,000 | Protestant Lutheran |
| Orissa Baptist Evangelistic Crusade (OBEC) | 650,000 | Protestant Baptist |
| Indian Brethren | 449,550 to 1,000,000 | Protestant (Kerala Brethren) |
| Presbyterian Church of India | 1,605,423 | Protestant (Reformed) |
| Reformed Presbyterian Church North East India | 15,000 | Protestant (Reformed) |
| Reformed Presbyterian Church of India | 10,000 | Protestant (Reformed) |
| Evangelical Church of Maraland | 30,000 | Protestant (Reformed) |
| Congregational Church in India | 5,500 | Protestant (Reformed) |
| Council of Reformed Churches of India | 200,000 | Protestant (Reformed) |
| Hindustani Covenant Church | 16,600 | Protestant |
| Evangelical Church | 250,000 | Protestant |
| New Apostolic Church | 1,448,209 | Protestant |
| Pentecostal Maranatha Gospel Church | 12,000 | Protestant |
| New Life Fellowship Association | 480,000 | Protestant |
| Sharon Fellowship Church | 50,000 | Protestant |
| Manna Full Gospel Churches | 275,000 | Protestant |
| Philadelphia Fellowship Church of India | 200,000 | Protestant |
| Seventh-day Adventist Church | 1,560,000 | Protestant (Restorationism) |
| Unitarian Union of Northeast India | 10,000 | Unitarian |
| Jehovah's Witnesses | 42,566 | Jehovah's Witnesses (Restorationism) |
| The Church of Jesus Christ of Latter-day Saints | 14,528 | Latter Day Saints (Restorationism) |
| Christian Revival Church | 21,447 | Protestant (Pentecostal) |
| Mennonite Brethren Church | 103,000 | Protestant (Reformed) |
| Community of Christ | 15,000+ | Latter Day Saints (Restorationism) |

== Conflicts and controversies ==
=== Hindu–Christian conflict and controversy ===
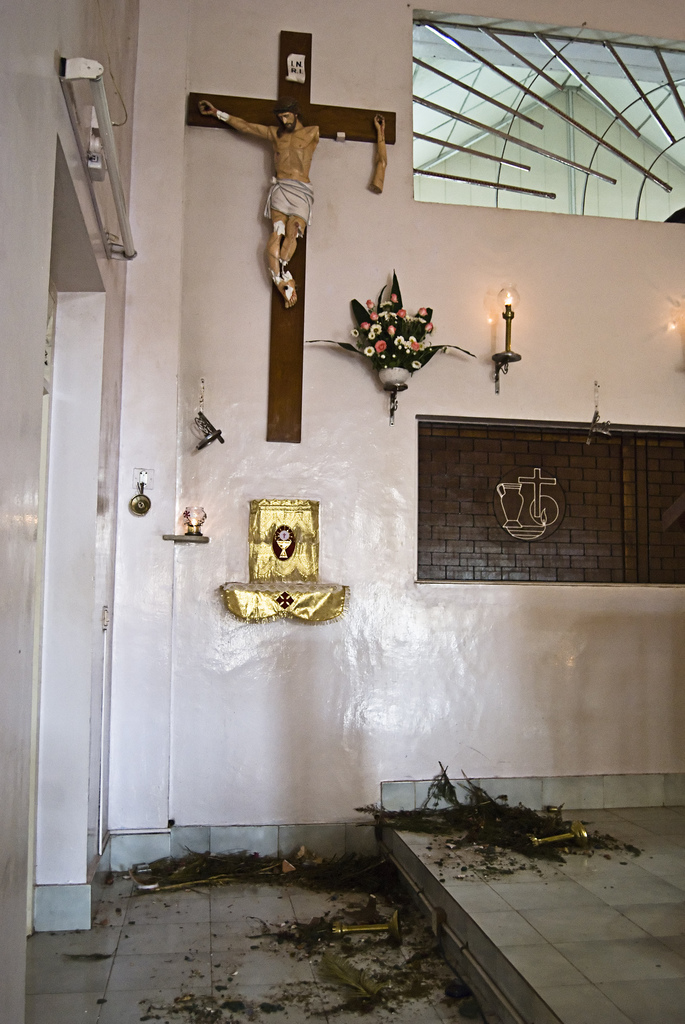
Adoration Monastery, Mangalore, after it was vandalised by the Bajrang Dal militants during the September 2008 attacks on Christians in Mangalore

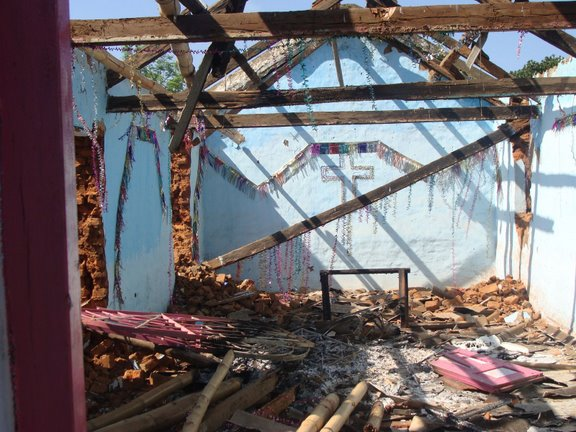
A house church burnt during the 2008 anti-Christian attacks in Orissa

The arrival of European colonialists brought about large-scale missionary activity in Coastal and Northeast India. The Cuncolim Massacre and the Mahratta invasions of Goa-Anjediva and Bombay-Bassein are among the first known clashes. Christianity has been propagandised as a "foreign" religion, with the growth of Hindu fundamentalism, despite the fact that several Christian individuals and institutions have been for Indian nationalism.

During the 1997–1999 anti-Christian violence in Gujarat, the Human Rights Watch reported that from 25 December 1988 to 3 January 1999, at least 20 prayer halls were damaged or burnt down and Christian institutions were attacked in the Dangs district, and its surrounding districts and at least 25 villages had reported incidents of burning and damages to prayer halls all over Gujarat.

On 22 January 1999, an Australian missionary Graham Staines and his two sons were burnt to death by Dara Singh while sleeping in his station wagon at Manoharpur village in Keonjhar district in Odisha, India. In the annual human rights reports for 1999, the United States Department of State also criticised India for "increasing societal violence against Christians". The report on anti-Christian violence listed over 90 incidents of anti-Christian violence, ranging from damage of religious property to violence against Christians pilgrims. The states of Rajasthan, Madhya Pradesh, Himachal Pradesh and Tamil Nadu passed laws placing restrictions on forced religious conversions as a result of communal tension between Christians and Hindus. The legislation passed in Tamil Nadu was later repealed.

In 2007, 19 churches were burned by Hindu right-wingers in Odisha following conflicts between Hindus and Christians regarding Christmas celebrations in the Kandhamal district.

In 2008, there was again violence against Christians, particularly in the state of Odisha. After the murder of Swami Lakshmanananda by Indian Maoists (communist insurgents), tensions flared between the two communities in 2008. Christians were blamed and attacked in Orissa with 38 killed and over 250 churches damaged while several thousands of Christians were displaced. Sitting Bharatiya Janata Party (BJP) MLA Manoj Pradhan was sentenced to rigorous imprisonment for six years by a fast track court for a murder during the 2008 communal riots in Odisha's Kandhamal district. The 2008 anti-Christian attacks in Orissa spilled over and escalated into the 2008 attacks on Christians in southern Karnataka state. The acts of violence include arson and vandalism of churches, forced conversion of Christians to Hinduism by threats of physical violence, distribution of threatening literature, burning of Bibles, raping of nuns, murder of Christian priests, and destruction of Christian schools, colleges and cemeteries.

A program or movement with its roots in Hindutva ideology, known as Ghar Wapsi ('returning home'), sponsored by a number of Hindu nationalist groups, facilitates the mass conversion of Christians – and, especially, Muslims – "back" to their supposedly "inherent" or "natural" religion of Hinduism. Organisations which promote Ghar wapasi include the far-right Rashtriya Swayamsevak Sangh (RSS), the Vishva Hindu Parishad (VHP) and Dharm Jagaran Samiti. Its support by influential officials within the BJP, the governing party, has led to criticism such that support threatens the secularism and freedom of religion enshrined in India's constitution.

India is number 10 on Open Doors' 2022 World Watch List, an annual ranking of the fifty countries where Christians face the most extreme persecution. However, a faction of the Syrian Christians of Kerala do support the Hindutva ideology and extremist groups like the Rashtriya Swayamsevak Sangh (RSS); which was involved in the violent and forceful demolition of the Babri Masjid. While some have argued that Hindu caste based discrimination has continued among Christians in India, other Indians and Hindus have denied caste based reservation to Dalit Christians.

=== Muslim–Christian conflict and controversy ===
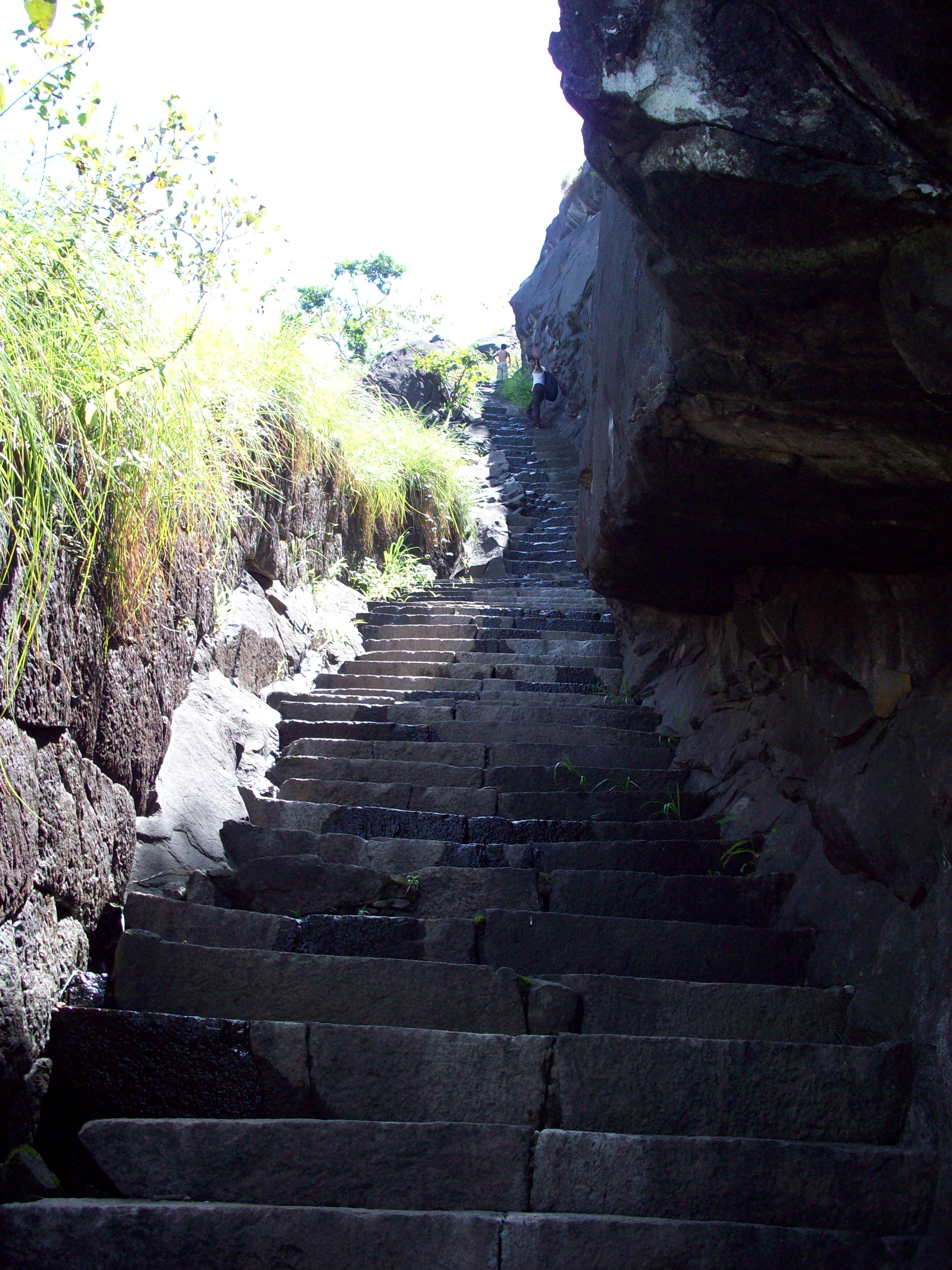
The Jamalabad fort route. Mangalorean Catholics travelled through this route on their way to Seringapatam.

The relationship between Muslims and Christians in India has also been occasionally turbulent. With the advent of European colonialism in India throughout the 16th, 17th and 18th centuries, Christians were systematically persecuted in certain Muslim-ruled kingdoms in India, particularly the actions by Tippu Sultan, the ruler of Mysore against the Mangalorean Catholics (South Canara). The captivity of Mangalorean Catholics at Seringapatam, which began on 24 February 1784 and ended 15 years later on 4 May 1799, remains the most disconsolate memory in that community's history.

The Bakur Manuscript reports Tippu Sultan as having said:

All Musalmans should unite together, considering the annihilation of infidels as a sacred duty, and labour to the utmost of their power, to accomplish that subject.

Soon after the Treaty of Mangalore in 1784, Tipu gained control of South Canara. He issued orders to seize the Christians in Canara, confiscate their estates, and deport them to Seringapatam, the capital of his empire, via the Jamalabad-fort route. However, there were no priests among the captives. Together with Fr Miranda, all the 21 arrested priests were issued orders of expulsion to Goa, fined Rs 200,000, and threatened with death by hanging if they ever returned.

Tipu ordered the destruction of twenty-seven Catholic churches all intricately carved with statues depicting various saints. Among them were Nossa Senhora de Rosario Milagres at Mangalore, Jesu Marie Jose at Omzoor, the Chapel at Bolar, the Church of Merces at Ullal, Imaculata Conceiciao at Mulki, Sao Lawrence at Karkal and Immaculata Conceciao at Baidnur. All were razed to the ground, with the exception of the Church of Holy Cross at Hospet, owing to the friendly offices of the Chauta Raja of Moodbidri.

An instigating factor that helped spark the Indian Rebellion of 1857 was, for Muslims sepoys, resistance to the East India Company's introduction of the new Enfield Rifle-Musket – abhorrent to them due to a belief that the weapon's cartridges, which they would be required to handle and even to bite open the encasing papers, were greased with pig fat, a religiously unacceptable agent for Muslim soldiers. Sepoys interpreted the rumours of grease constituents as a deliberate ploy by the company to defile Muslim soldiers so that they would convert to Christianity. In combination with a corresponding idea that cow fat was included to defile Hindu soldiers, this was perceived as an attempt to impose Christian law in Hindustan.

Historian William Dalrymple notes the religiously imbued rhetoric employed, in contrast to nationalistic sentiment. For instance, when Mughal Emperor Bahadur Shah Zafar met the sepoys on 11 May 1857, he was told: "We have joined hands to protect our religion and our faith." They later stood in Chandni Chowk, the main square, and asked the people gathered there, "Brothers, are you with those of the faith?" Those British men and women who had previously converted to Islam such as the defectors, Sergeant-Major Gordon, and Abdullah Beg, a former Company soldier, were spared. In contrast, foreign Christians such as the Rev Midgeley John Jennings, as well as Indian converts to Christianity such as one of Zafar's personal physicians, Chaman Lal, were killed outright. Dalrymple recounts that as late as 6 September, when calling the inhabitants of Delhi to rally against the upcoming British assault, Zafar issued a proclamation stating that this was a religious war being prosecuted on behalf of "the faith", and that all Muslim and Hindu residents of the imperial city, or of the countryside were encouraged to stay true to their faith and creeds. He observes that the Urdu sources of the pre- and post-rebellion periods usually refer to the British not as angrez ('the English'), goras ('whites') or firangis ('foreigners'), but as kafir ('infidels') and nasrani ('Christians').

Muslims in India who convert to Christianity are considered apostates and subject to harassment, intimidation, and attacks by Muslims. In Jammu and Kashmir, a Christian convert and missionary named Bashir Tantray was killed, allegedly by militant Islamists in 2006.

== List of Christian communities in India ==
=== Christian communities ===
- Anglo-Indian people
- Bengali Christians
- Bettiah Christians
- Bombay East Indian Catholics
- Christian Revival Church
- Dalit Christians
- Goan Catholics
- Karwari Catholics
- Knanaya Christians
- Latin Catholics of Malabar
- Mangalorean Christians
- Marathi Christians
- Meitei Christians
- Protestants in India
- Punjabi Christians
- Reddy Catholics
- St Thomas Christians
- Tamil Christians
- Telugu Christian

=== Christianity by state/territory ===
- Christianity in Arunachal Pradesh
- Christianity in Assam
- Christianity in Bihar
- Christianity in Chhattisgarh
- Christianity in Delhi
- Christianity in Goa
- Christianity in Gujarat
- Christianity in Jharkhand
- Christianity in Karnataka
- Christianity in Kerala
- Christianity in Madhya Pradesh
- Christianity in Maharashtra
- Christianity in Manipur
- Christianity in Meghalaya
- Christianity in Mizoram
- Christianity in Nagaland
- Christianity in Odisha
- Christianity in Punjab
- Christianity in Tamil Nadu
- Christianity in Tripura
- Christianity in Uttar Pradesh
- Christianity in West Bengal

== See also ==
- Ancient Christianity in the Indian Subcontinent
- Anti-Christian violence in India
- Anti-Christian violence in Karnataka
- Christian ashram movement
- Christian seminaries and theological colleges in India
- Christianity in Bangladesh
- Christianity in Pakistan
- Christianity in Nepal
- Christianity in Sri Lanka
- Church of India, Burma and Ceylon
- Caste system among South Asian Christians
- Dalit theology
- Francis Xavier
- Freedom of religion in India
- Graham Staines
- History of Pentecostalism in India
- Indian Christian Day
- Indian Christian Front
- Indian Christian Marriage Act of 1872
- Indian Christian Weddings
- Indigenous religion in India
- Irreligion in India
- Jesus in India
- Joseph Mary Bernini
- Koswad
- List of cathedrals in India
- List of Saints from India
- List of basilicas in India
- List of Catholic missionaries in India
- List of Protestant missionaries in India
- St Mary's Festival
- Rice Christians
- Sikhism in India
- Teresa of Calcutta
- Valentine's Day in India
