= Saint Thomas Pentecostal Christians =

St. Thomas Christian Pentecostals

Total population
- Approximately 149,664 (70% of all Keralite Pentecostals)

Regions with significant populations
- Kerala, India; with immigrant congregations in Europe, North America and Australia

Languages
- Malayalam, English, Hindi and most other languages of India

Religion
- Pentecostalism, Neo-charismatic movement

Related ethnic groups
- Malayalis, Knanaya, Cochin Jews

Saint Thomas Pentecostal Christians, also called Pentecostal Syrian Christians, are the ethnic Saint Thomas Christians (Nasranis) affiliated to various Pentecostal and independent Neo-Charismatic churches. Sometimes, the Kerala Brethren are also erroneously lumped together with Pentecostals. The community is native to the Indian state of Kerala, and shares in the legacy of early Christianity in the region, traditionally traced to the missionary activities of Saint Thomas the Apostle in the first century (AD 52–72). Prior to their conversion to Pentecostalism, they belonged to traditional Saint Thomas Christian denominations.

== Origin ==
Pentecostalism in Kerala, has its origins in the activities of German–American missionary George E. Berg and his Indian co-workers, in 1911. The first converts came from a small Kerala Brethren congregation based in Thuvayur, near Adoor. This group, which was led by Paruttupara Ummachan, became the first Pentecostal congregation of South India. During his Kerala tour, Berg also got acquainted with a few more young men, who accompanied him to Bangalore, where they received their Pentecostal instruction. Two of them, Umman Mammen and Pandalam Mattai, worked as Pentecostal evangelists, after their return to Kerala.

In 1912, Berg returned to the United States, where he met Robert F. Cook. Berg convinced Cook about the mission in India. So in 1913, Cook joined Berg, in Bangalore. In the coming years, Cook made several missionary journeys to Kerala, and financially supported the original native Pentecostal evangelists of Kerala, as well as the congregation of Thuvayur. Additional help came from Mary Chapman, an Assemblies of God missionary, who arrived in Trivandrum, by this time. Soon other foreign evangelists followed. In the first half of the 1920s, a large number of Kerala Brethren (mostly ex–Mar Thomites) became Pentecostals and were known as Malankara Poorna Suvisesha Sabha

== Growth and splits ==
Pentecostalism continued to grow among Saint Thomas Christians and in Kerala it was commonly known as Malankara Poorna Suvisesha Sabha in the following decades. However, this period was marked by constant disagreements and quarrels among the leaders of the movement. Disputes arose over questions of leadership, financial aspects, affiliation to foreign missionary organizations etc. As a result, in the 1930s four different Pentecostal churches dominated by St. Thomas Christians emerged. They were the Assemblies of God of India, Church of God in India, Ceylon Pentecostal Mission and Indian Pentecostal Church of God. K. E. Abraham, P. M. Samuel and K. C. Cherian, the co–founders of the Indian Pentecostal Church of God, originally belonged to the Malankara Jacobite Syriac Orthodox Church.

Internal strife within the first four churches led to the establishment of newer ones like the Sharon Fellowship Church (P. J. Thomas, 1953), New India Church of God (V. A. Thamby, 1973), New India Bible Church (Thomas Philip, Abraham Philip, 1972) etc. The Gospel for Asia (K. P. Yohannan, 1979) was yet another Pentecostal missionary organization found by a St. Thomas Christian. Ultimately, K. P. Yohannan got ordained as a bishop and set up the Believers Eastern Church, under the auspices of the Gospel for Asia.

=== Knanaya Pentecostals ===
The Pentecostal wave that swept through the St. Thomas Christian community, naturally generated ripples in the Knanaya community; an endogamous subcaste of Nasranis. The Knanaya Christians traditionally belong to the Syro-Malabar Catholic Archeparchy of Kottayam and Malankara Syriac Knanaya Archdiocese. V. A. Thamby, who hailed from the Knanaya community, converted to Pentecostalism in 1962. Initially, Thamby started a couple of house churches among the Knanaya.

From 1973 onwards, Thamby worked in collaboration with Australian pastor Cliff Beard. With Beard's support, Thamby went on a preaching journey to the United States, and acquired the necessary sponsorships, which enabled him to establish the New India Church of God. Thamby's wife, Mariamma Thamby supported her husband in every possible way. After completing her Biblical studies in Australia, Mariamma Thamby opened a Bible school for women in 1983.

In 1988, Thamby moved to Chingavanam, a long-established centre of the Knanaya community, where he put up his church's headquarters. From there, he launched a rigorous campaign to proselytize Knanaya Christians. He met with significant success, for Chingavanam soon became the largest congregation of the New India Church of God.

== Independent 'New–Generation' Churches ==
Neo–Charismatic churches were founded at the turn of the 21st century, by individuals who left traditional Saint Thomas Christian denominations, with a craving for prayerful renewal, revitalization, faith healing and miracles. There was also a general discontent with the rigid clergy-oriented, liturgical framework of traditional churches, that offered little or no room for revival. Many new–generation churches espouse Prosperity theology, and are particularly popular with the financially insecure St. Thomas Christian diaspora. Neo–Pentecostal worship is usually spirit–filled with clapping, singing, ecstatic dancing and miracles, as opposed to the codified liturgical worship in traditional churches.

Prominent Neo–Pentecostal churches with predominantly St. Thomas Christian members include Heavenly Feast, Covenant People, Parra etc. Heavenly Feast was founded in 1998, by Matthew Kuruvilla (originally Malankara Orthodox). Regular Sunday worshippers in the Heavenly Feast headquarters in Kottayam, number about 15,000. Covenant People was founded by Jose Anathanam (originally Syro-Malabar Catholic) in 1996. About 60 percent of Covenant People affiliates are former Syro-Malabar Catholics and 40 percent are from other historic St. Thomas Christian denominations. Parra, which means Rock, was founded in Thiruvalla by wealthy, young Middle East returnees, to cater to English-speaking Kerala youth, typically raised abroad.

== Cultural and Social attributes ==
A diagram showing the history of the divisions among the Saint Thomas Christians.

Classical Kerala Pentecostals do not wear ornaments. They oppose the ordination of women. Some are even against taking medicines. Many of them wear only traditional white clothing for their worship services. Conventional Keralite Pentecostals also hold somewhat radical views regarding holiness (Visudhi) and separation from the world (Verpadu), which they inherited from their Kerala Brethren precursors. All these practices have caused traditional Keralite Pentecostals to suffer social ostracism to some extent. Neo–Charismatic churches, however, do not impose such restrictions.

=== Casteism ===
Pentecostal Syrian Christians have been dubbed "sheep stealers" by leaders of traditional Saint Thomas Christian denominations, due to their eagerness to gain more St. Thomas Christian converts. Pentecostal Syrian Christians are an endogamous sect; they do not marry into or from other castes or Christian denominations.

Pentecostal St. Thomas Christians have been accused of prejudicial treatment of Dalit Christians in their churches. Despite being numerically significant, Dalit Pentecostals were easily bypassed by Syrian Pentecostals for education, overseas financial support and leadership positions. Syrian Pentecostals were wary of Dalits rising to leadership because they feared that it would lead to loss of societal status, and thus hinder the growth of Pentecostal churches. Syrians also denounced the Dalit support for Communism in Kerala. In 1972, as a result of Dalit segregation, the Church of God in Kerala, got divided into Church of God (Kerala Division) for Dalits, and Church of God (Kerala State) for Syrians.

== Numbers ==
A 2016 study under the aegis of the Govt. of Kerala, based on the data from 2011 Census of India and Kerala Migration Surveys, counted 213,806 Pentecost/Brethren affiliates in Kerala. On a rough reckoning, 70 percent of all Keralite Pentecostals or 149,664 people are Saint Thomas Christians. Pentecostals comprise 3.5 percent of all Keralite Christians and 0.6 percent of the total population of Kerala. 47.2 percent of all Keralite Pentecostals live in Pathanamthitta district, followed by Kollam district (11.1 percent), Thiruvananthapuram district (10.5 percent) and Idukki district (10.4 percent). 12.7 percent of all Christians in Pathanamthitta district are Pentecostals.

== See also ==
- Pentecostalism in Kerala
- History of Pentecostalism in India
- Christianity in Kerala

== Bibliography ==
- Zachariah, K.C. (April 2016). "Religious denominations of Kerala" (PDF). Centre for Development Studies. Archived from the original (PDF) on 17 April 2018.
- Ross, Israel J. (1979). "Ritual and Music in South India: Syrian Christian Liturgical Music in Kerala". Asian Music. 11 (1): 80–98. doi:10.2307/833968. JSTOR 833968.
- Bergunder, Michael (6 June 2008). The South Indian Pentecostal Movement in the Twentieth Century. Wm. B. Eerdmans Publishing. ISBN 978-0-8028-2734-0.
- Anderson, Allan; Tang, Edmond (2005). Asian and Pentecostal: The Charismatic Face of Christianity in Asia. OCMS. ISBN 978-1-870345-43-9.
- Karkkainen, Veli-Matti (26 August 2009). The Spirit in the World: Emerging Pentecostal Theologies in Global Contexts. Wm. B. Eerdmans Publishing. ISBN 978-0-8028-6281-5.
- Hefner, Robert W. (2 October 2013). Global Pentecostalism in the 21st Century. Indiana University Press. ISBN 978-0-253-01094-0.
- John, Stanley J. Valayil C. (19 February 2018). Transnational Religious Organization and Practice: A Contextual Analysis of Kerala Pentecostal Churches in Kuwait. BRILL. ISBN 978-90-04-36101-0.
- John, Stanley (10 December 2020). "The Rise of 'New Generation' Churches in Kerala Christianity". World Christianity–Methodological Considerations. Brill. pp. 271–291. ISBN 978-90-04-44486-7.
- Veeraraj, Anand; McDermott, Rachel Fell (30 November 2009). Pilgrims at the Crossroads: Asian Indian Christians at the North American Frontier. Institute for the Study of Asian American Christianity. ISBN 978-0-9819878-2-8.
- Havea, Jione (29 April 2022). Bordered Bodies, Bothered Voices: Native and Migrant Theologies. Wipf and Stock Publishers. ISBN 978-1-6667-0768-7.
- Anderson, Allan Heaton (24 October 2013). An Introduction to Pentecostalism: Global Charismatic Christianity. Cambridge University Press. ISBN 978-1-107-47069-9.
- Koshy, Rev K. V. (1999). St. Thomas and the Syrian Churches of India. ISPCK. ISBN 978-81-7214-495-1.
- Kurien, Prema A. (20 June 2017). Ethnic Church Meets Megachurch: Indian American Christianity in Motion. NYU Press. ISBN 978-1-4798-2637-7.
- Wilfred, Felix (23 May 2014). The Oxford Handbook of Christianity in Asia. Oxford University Press. ISBN 978-0-19-934152-8.
- Rajan, S. Irudaya; Oommen, Ginu Zacharia (27 November 2019). Asianization of Migrant Workers in the Gulf Countries. Springer Nature. ISBN 978-981-329-287-1.
- George, Sam (26 April 2022). Interconnections of Asian Diaspora: Mapping the Linkages and Discontinuities. Fortress Press. ISBN 978-1-5064-7829-6.
- Leustean, Lucian N. (30 May 2014). Eastern Christianity and Politics in the Twenty-First Century. Routledge. ISBN 978-1-317-81865-6.
- Phan, Peter C. (21 January 2011). Christianities in Asia. John Wiley & Sons. ISBN 978-1-4443-9260-9.
- Sahanam, L. E. (2009). Belonging But Not Believing: Interfaith Marriage. ISPCK. ISBN 978-81-8458-088-4.
- Yong, Amos; Synan, Vinson (2016). Global Renewal Christianity: Spirit-empowered Movements Past, Present, and Future. Charisma Media. ISBN 978-1-62998-688-3.
- Williams, Raymond Brady; Brady, Williams Raymond (13 November 1996). Christian Pluralism in the United States: The Indian Immigrant Experience. Cambridge University Press. ISBN 978-0-521-57016-9.
- Yong, Amos (1 July 2005). The Spirit Poured Out on All Flesh: Pentecostalism and the Possibility of Global Theology. Baker Books. ISBN 978-1-4412-0673-2.
- Bhattacharya, Sabyasachi (2011). Approaches to History: Essays in Indian Historiography. Primus Books. ISBN 978-93-80607-17-7.
- Goh, Robbie B. H. (1 February 2018). Protestant Christianity in the Indian Diaspora: Abjected Identities, Evangelical Relations, and Pentecostal Visions. State University of New York Press. ISBN 978-1-4384-6943-0.
- Frykenberg, Robert Eric (27 June 2008). Christianity in India: From Beginnings to the Present. OUP Oxford. ISBN 978-0-19-154419-4.
