= History of Pentecostalism in India =

Pentecostalism has grown in India since its introduction in the early twentieth century. Several Pentecostal missionaries who had participated in the Azusa Street Revival visited Kerala from 1909 onwards. During the 1920s the missionary Robert F. Cook established the Indian churches based in Kerala. In 1921 First Assembly of God fellowship was started by Pastor C. Manasseh in Kuzhithakidi a neighbouring village of Kattakada which today stands as Hebron Assembly of God Konniyoor. In 1922 Mrs. Sheelal Manasseh pioneered Assemblies of GOD church was established in Melpuram which was part of then Travancore state by missionaries. It has been one of the early pioneering churches in the region. Two other churches founded around this time were Ceylon Pentecostal Mission (CPM) later became The Pentecostal Mission, in the 1923s, founded in Sri Lanka by the Indian evangelist Pastor Paul, and later brought to India; and the Indian Pentecostal Church of God, set up by K.E. Abraham after he split from the church founded by Cook. A later foundation, in 1953, was the Sharon Fellowship, which runs the Sharon Women's Bible College.

== 20th century ==
=== Robert F. Cook and the Church of God ===
During the early 20th century, the Pentecostal movement experienced rapid growth with the arrival of a number of foreign missionaries. One of the most significant among the missionaries of that period was Robert F. Cook, from the United States. He came to India in October 1913 and established a few mission posts in North India. However, due to lack of support, he was unable to develop his work in a significant manner. Cook relocated his headquarters to Mulakuzha in Kerala. The headquarters of the Church of God in India remains there now.

=== The Pentecostal Mission ===
The Pentecostal Mission (TPM), formerly known as Ceylon Pentecostal Mission (CPM), is a Pentecostal denomination which originated in Ceylon, now Sri Lanka. The international headquarters is now situated in Chennai, Tamil Nadu, India. Ceylon Pentecostal Mission was founded in 1923 by a convert from Hinduism named Ramankutty, later known as Pastor Paul. Pastor Paul was born to Hindu parents in the district of Trichur in Kerala. While in Sri Lanka, at the age of 18, he became a Christian. Later, he began to preach and share the gospel in various parts of India and Sri Lanka. In the initial stages, he had worked with other evangelists. Pastor Paul served as the founder and chief pastor of this church.

This organization stands out among the Pentecostal churches because of its exclusivist teachings and organization structure. Some of the distinctive features are that full-time workers were expected to practice an ascetic life-style including celibacy, obedience to the elder pastors, and communal living (including disposal of private possessions) in faith homes. Today the church is known by different names in different countries, but all stand under the name of "The Pentecostal Mission". It now has churches in over 85 countries.

=== Indian Pentecostal Church of God ===
K.E. Abraham, a pastor who had worked closely with Cook for a number of years, decided that he no longer wanted the mission work taking place in India to receive foreign funds. With that as his main reason, he split from Cook and established the Indian Pentecostal Church of God (IPC) in 1924. Many others were involved in the establishment of IPC, which became largest Pentecostal Denomination in India.

=== Sharon Fellowship ===
Sharon Fellowship Church was founded in 1953 by Pastor P. J. Thomas, Pastor Thadathil George Koshy (later Founder President of Faith Theological Seminary in Kerala) and ten other members including two women.

Pastor P.J. Thomas was born on 15 April 1914, the son of Pastor P.V. John. He converted to Christianity in 1936. He studied at Serampore University and earned a Diploma in Theology. He went on to attend Wheaton College (Illinois) where he received a master's degree in Comparative Religion, and taught there for a short time before returning to India in 1952. He purchased the present Sharon property in March 1953 and with the completion of the Sharon Hall, he founded Sharon Bible School and later formed Sharon Fellowship Church. He died on 24 March 1998, and was succeeded as president by Rev. Dr. T.G. Koshy. In January 2015, due to ill health, Rev. Koshy handed over the presidency to Rev. John Thomas, while remaining in his capacity as Senior General Minister. In 2020 February Rev. Dr. T. G. Koshy entered glory and was succeeded as Senior General Minister by Rev. Dr. P.G Jacob

Sister Aleyamma Thomas of the Sharon Fellowship was instrumental in starting the first Women's Training Centre in India at Thiruvalla, Kerala, which is now known as Sharon Women's Bible College.

The Sharon Fellowship has more than 2,050 local churches in India and another 34 churches internationally; this is in addition to several associated Bible Schools and seminars. P J Thomas's son name John Thomas is the international president and Abraham Joseph is the national president of the Sharon fellowship church.

=== Assemblies of God in India ===
The Assemblies of God in India, representing many of the Pentecostal churches in India, now has 8,000 member churches. Its governing body is the General Council of the Assemblies of God. It is a member of the World Assemblies of God Fellowship and having Southern Asia Bible College in Bangalore. The state of Kerala has now been divided into two in order to better handle the growth. 8 Southern revenue districts (Thiruvananthapuram to Thrissur) are grouped together called 'Malayalam District Council'. Late. Rev.Dr. P. S Philip served as the superintendent of AG Malayalam District Council. Rev. T.J. Samuel currently serves as the Superintendent of the Assemblies of God Malayalam District Council (AGMDC)and the rest of the revenue districts (Palakkad to Kasaragod) formed 'Malabar District Council and Rev. V T Abraham serve as the superintendent of AG Malabar District Council. Both these District councils are coming under the "South India Assemblies of God". The church has also established a number of Bible Schools throughout India. Pastor Sam U serves as the youth department (Christ's Ambassadors-CA) President of Malayalam District Council of Kerala. The Bethel Assembly of God Church headed by Rev. Dr. M.A Varughese, The Full Gospel Assembly of God Church led by Rev. Dr. Paul Thangaiah are Other Assemblies of God Megachurches that are very influential in the country.

=== Saron Bethel Deva Sabai in India ===
The Saron Bethel Deva Sabai was founded in 1979 by Rev D Samuel in Melpuram Kanyakumari District It has 10+ Local Church and Prayer House. It is an Pentecostal Christian Denomination in India. Its organisational headquarters located in Melpuram Location is SBDS Headquarters

== 21st century ==
The Indian Pentecostal Church of God, Church of God in India, The Pentecostal Mission, The Assemblies of God, Sharon Fellowship are some of the largest among the Pentecostal organizations in India. There are numerous other groups that are either independent or affiliated to the above-mentioned mainline Pentecostal groups. With strong support from churches and charities in the United States, Europe and Australia, these groups have been able to build organizations with presence in almost every state of India. Many of these groups are more charismatic in theology and often do not conform to the foundational teachings accepted by the mainline Pentecostal churches.

== See also ==
- Pandita Ramabai
- Pentecostalism in Kerala
