= Religion in Kerala =

Overview of religion in the Indian state of Kerala

Religion in Kerala (2011 census)
1. Hinduism (54.7%)
2. Islam (26.6%)
3. Christianity (18.4%)
4. Other / None (0.33%)

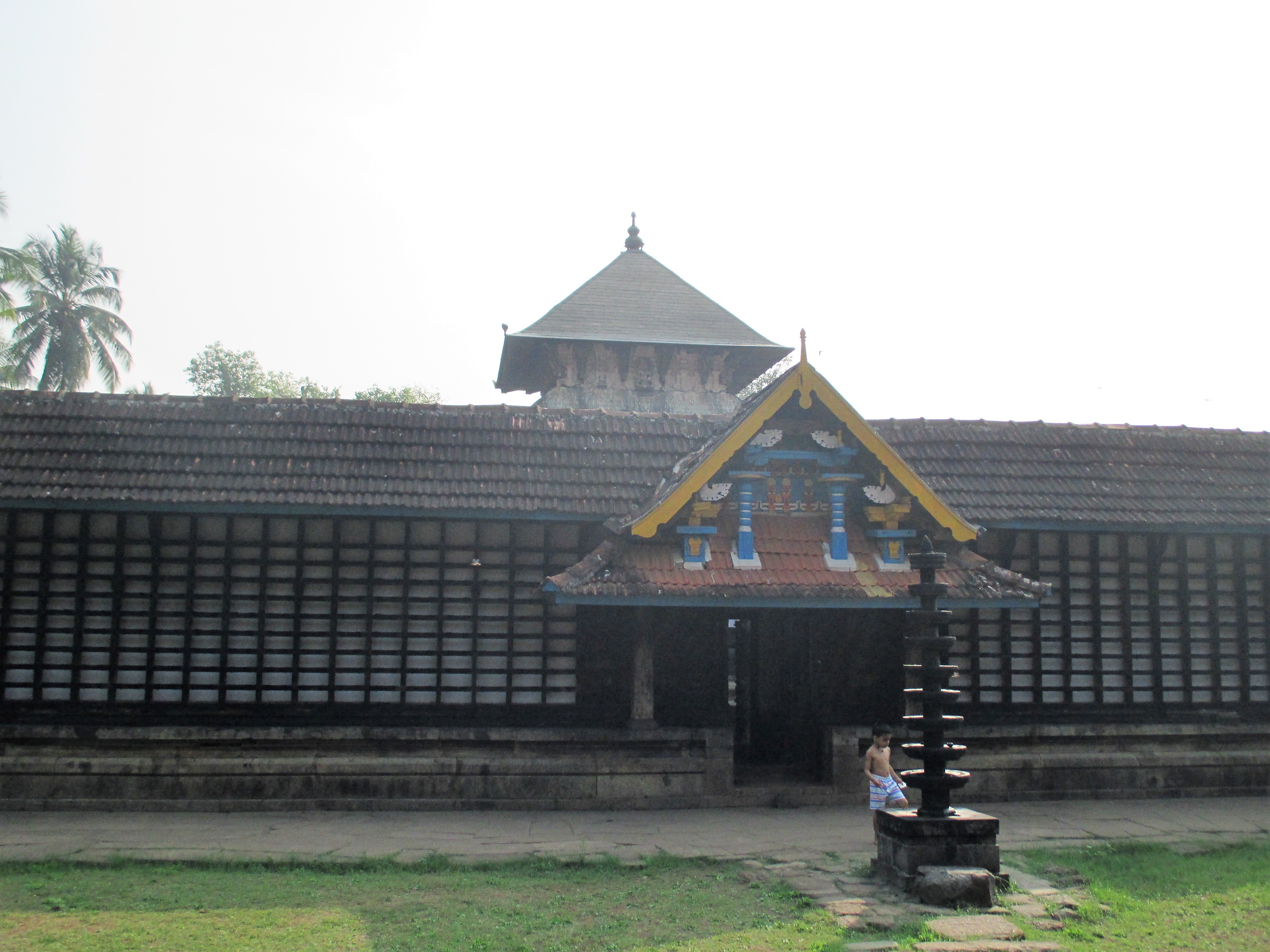
Thirunavaya Navamukunda Temple.

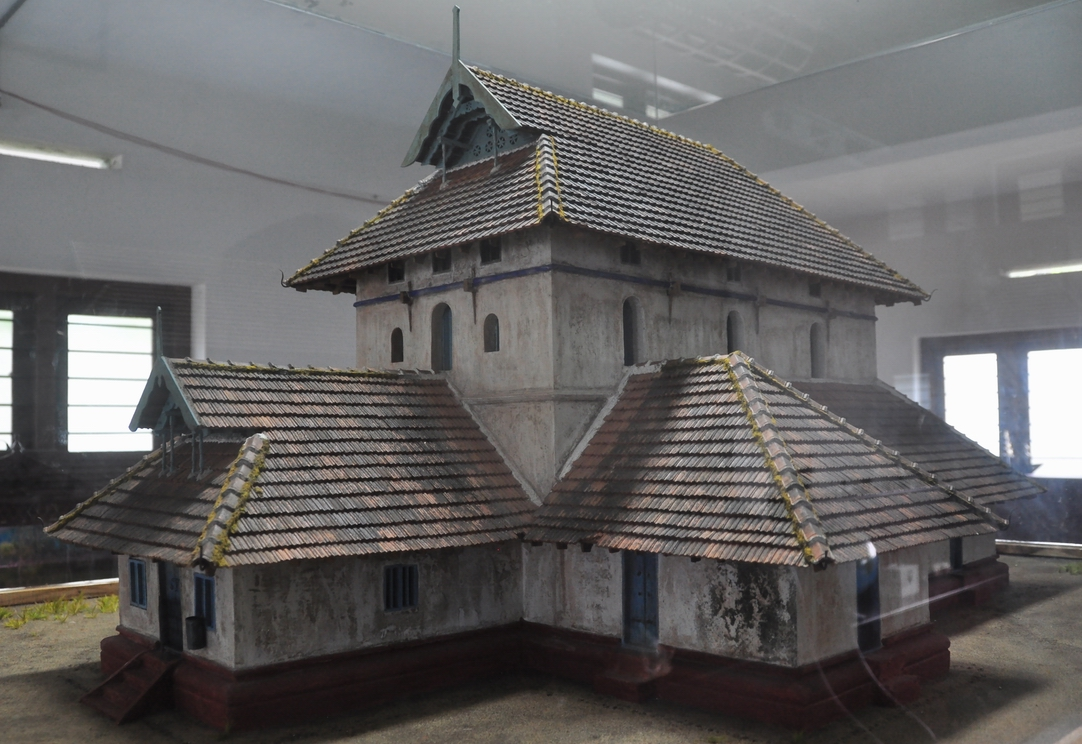
A rebuilt structure of the old Cheraman Juma Mosque

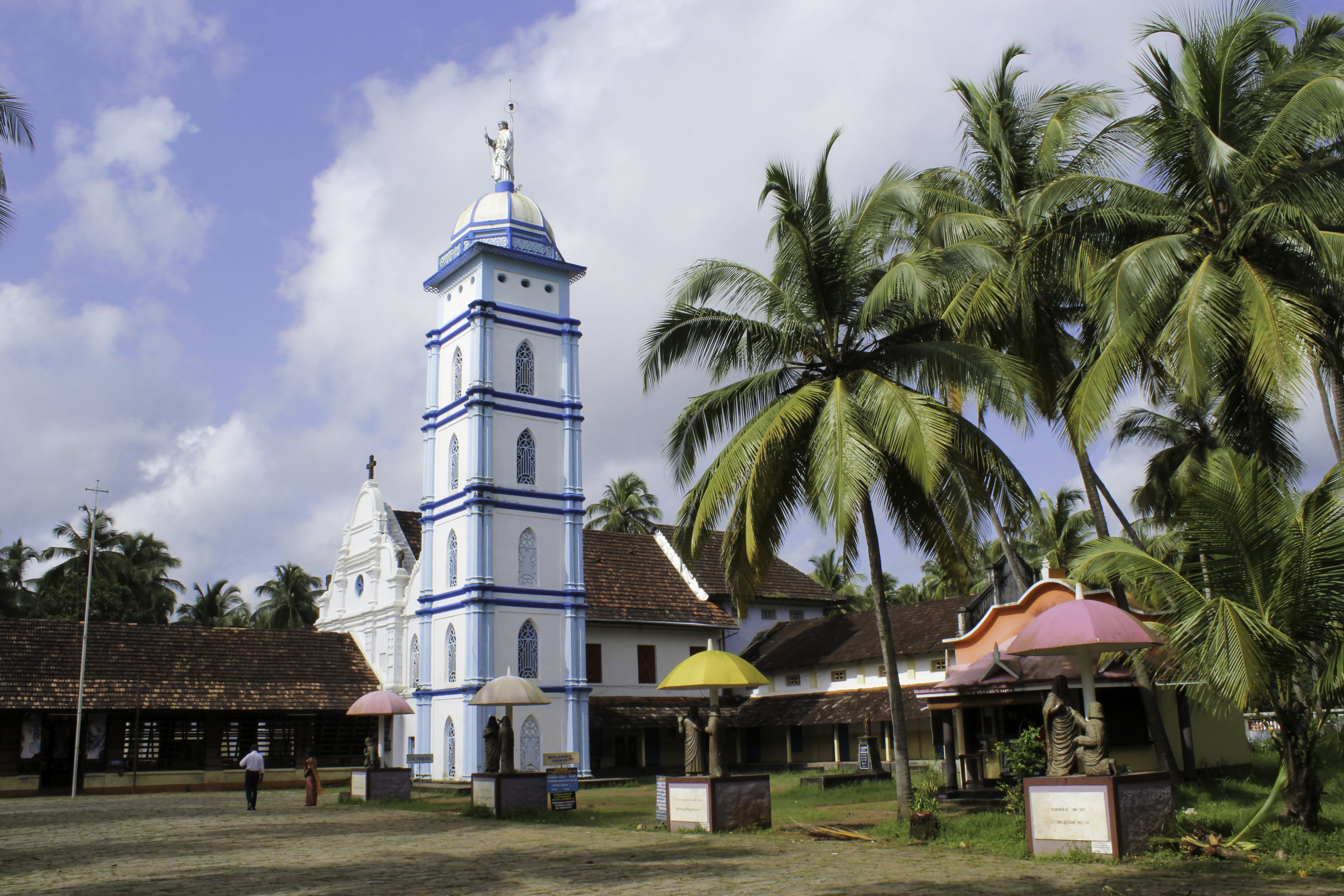
Palayur Saint Thomas Church of Syrian Christians.

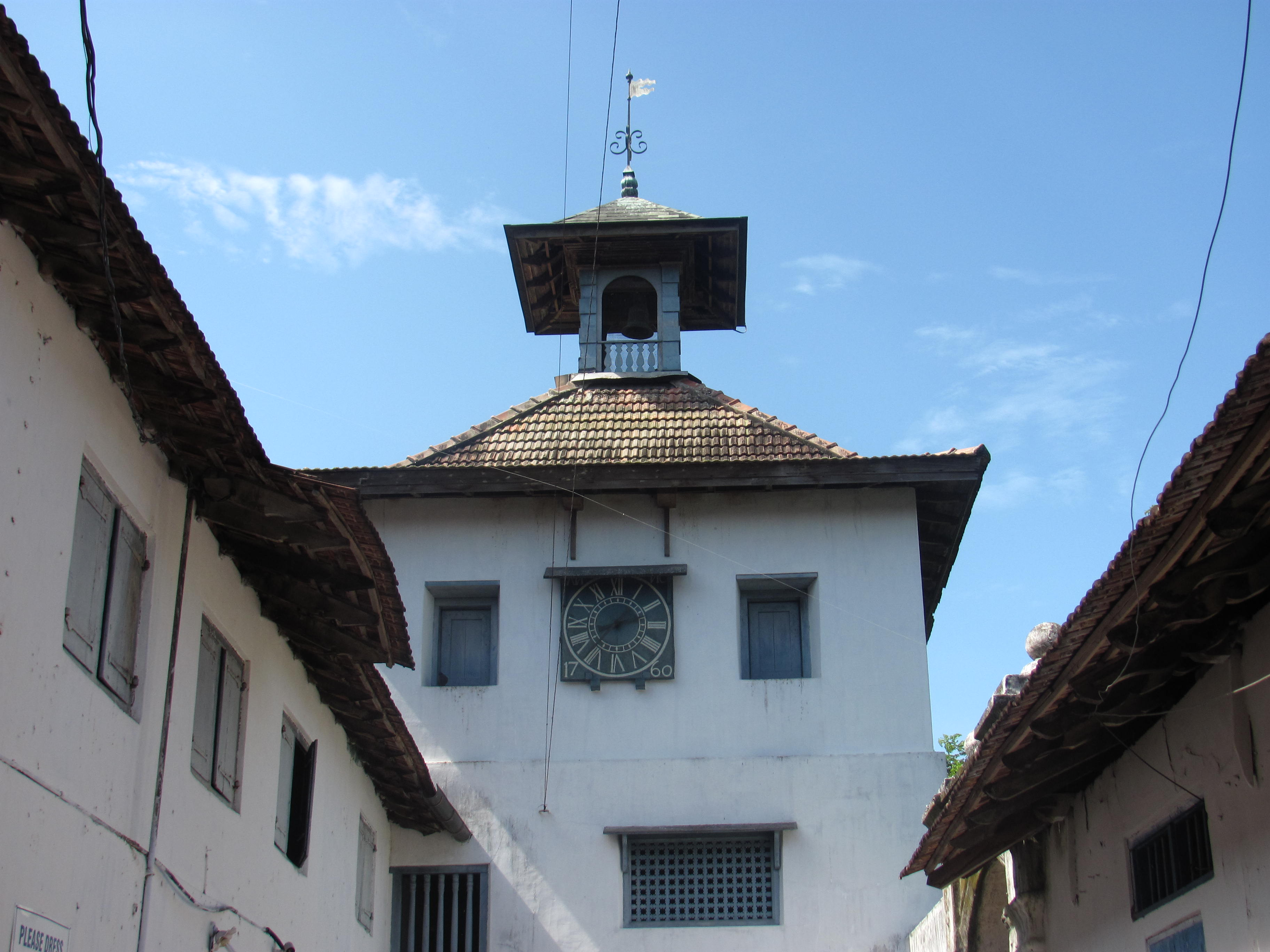
Paradesi Synagogue in 1344 AD.

Religion in Kerala is diverse. According to 2011 census of India figures, 54.73% of Kerala's population follows Hinduism, 26.56% are followers of Islam, 18.38% follow Christianity, and the remaining 0.33% follow other religions or have no religion.

The historical legends regarding the origin of Kerala are Hindu in nature. Kerala produced several saints and movements. Adi Shankara was a religious philosopher who contributed to Hinduism and propagated the philosophy of Advaita. Hindus represent the biggest religious group in all districts except Malappuram, where they are outnumbered by Muslims. Various tribal people in Kerala have retained the religious beliefs of their ancestors.

== Hinduism ==
Hinduism is the most widely professed faith in Kerala. According to 2011 Census of India figures, 54.7% of Kerala's residents are Hindus. Hindus represent the biggest religious group in all districts except Malappuram.

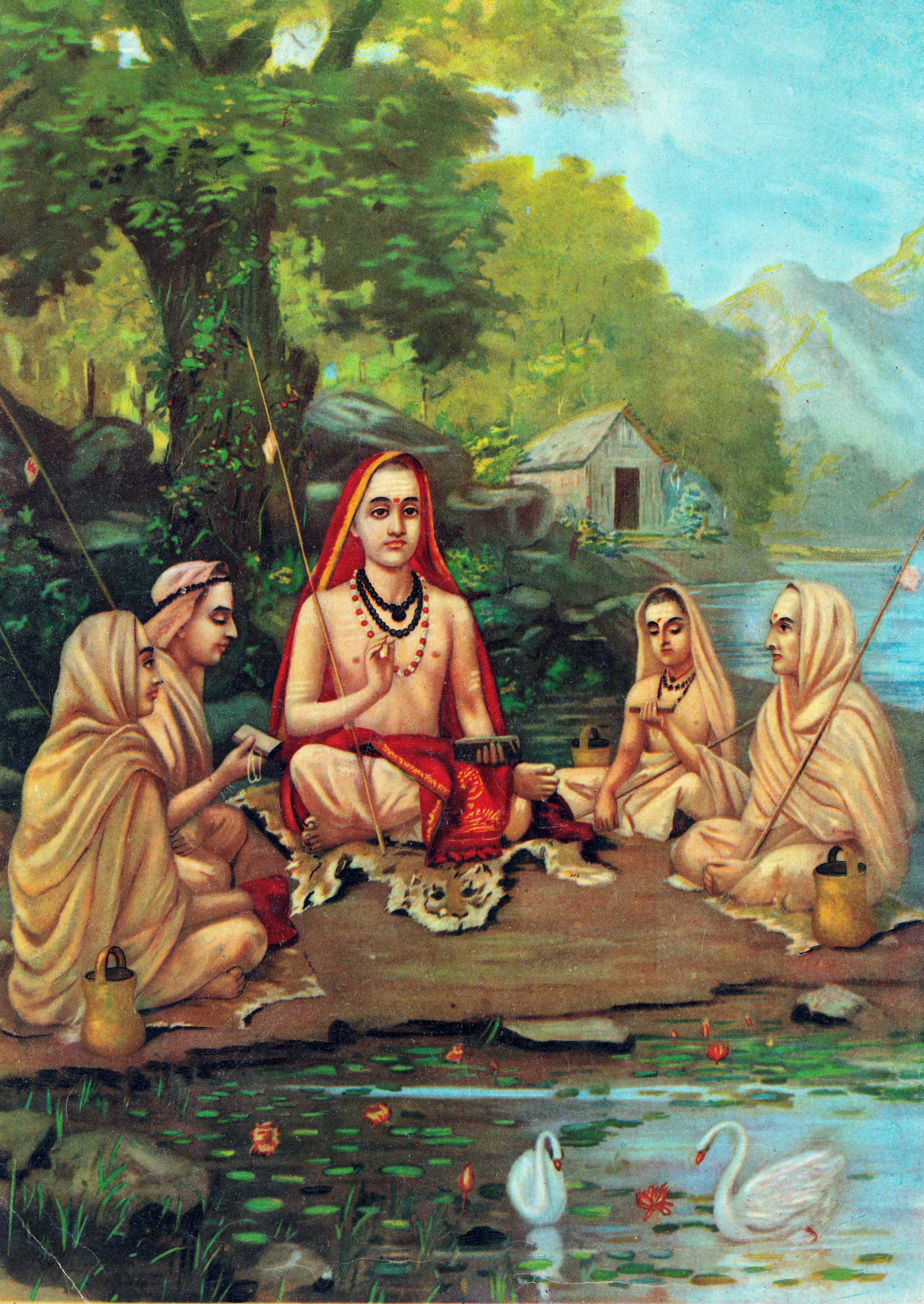
Adi Shankara, was from Kerala.

Kerala produced several saints and movements. Adi Shankara was a religious philosopher who contributed to Hinduism and propagated the philosophy of Advaita. He was instrumental in establishing four mathas at Sringeri, Dwarka, Puri and Jyotirmath. Melpathur Narayana Bhattathiri was another religious figure who composed Narayaniyam, a collection of verses in praise of the Hindu God Krishna.

Various practises of Hinduism are unique to Kerala. Worship of Shiva and Vishnu is popular in Kerala. Lord Krishna is worshipped widely in all parts of Kerala, Guruvayur being one of the most famous temples in the state. Malayali Hindus also worship Bhagavathi as a form of Shakti. Almost every village in Kerala has a Bhagavati Goddess. Hindus in Kerala also strongly believe in power of snake gods and usually have sacred snake groves known as Sarpa Kavu near to their houses.

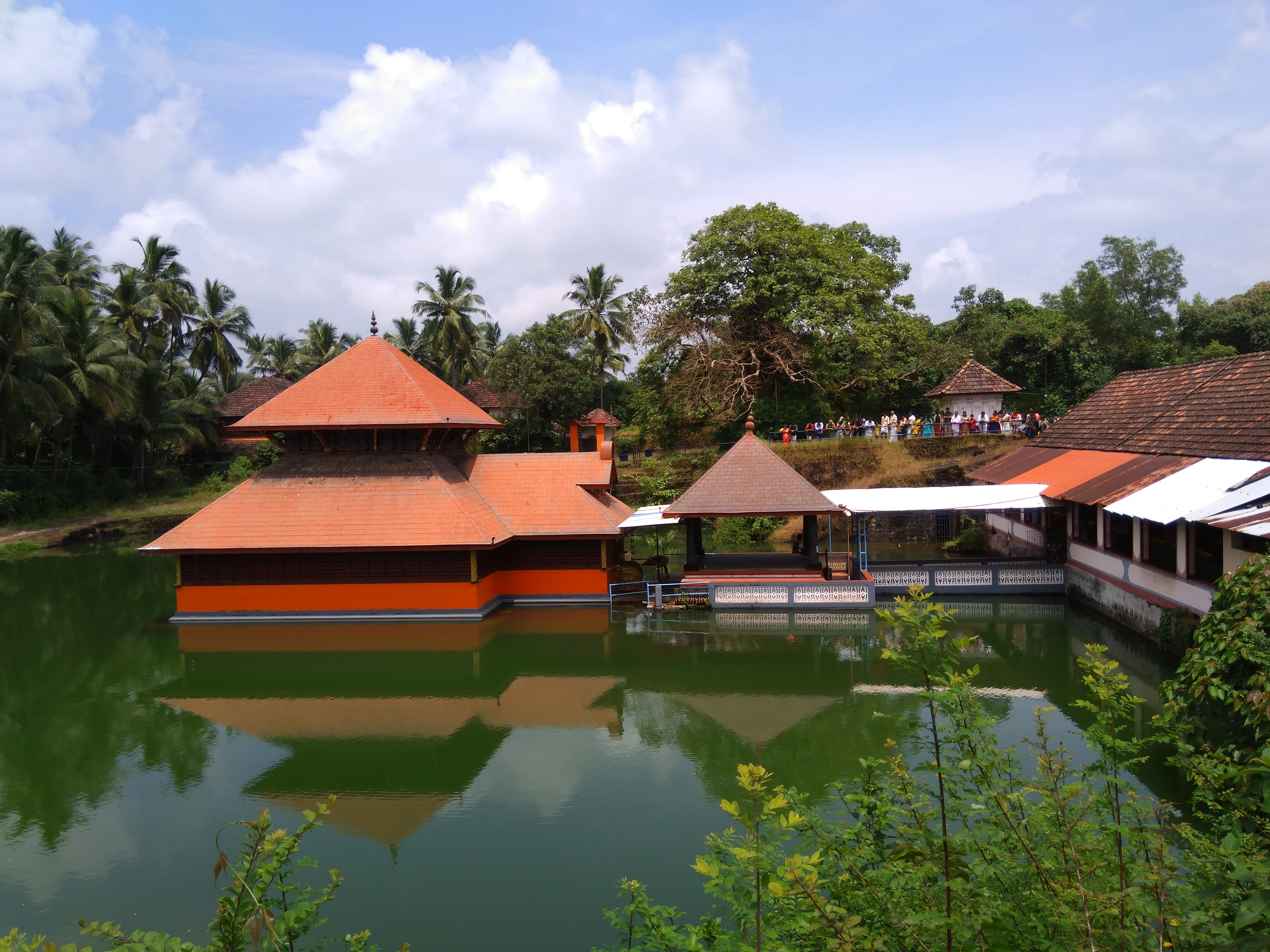
Ananthapura Lake Temple, Kasaragod

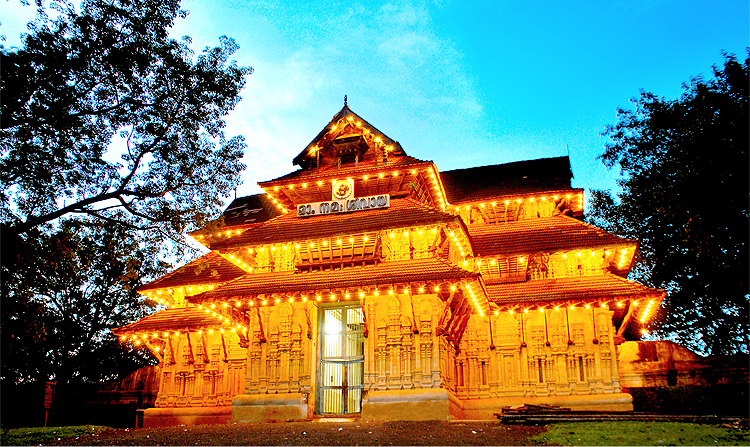
Vadakkunnathan Temple dedicated to Shiva at Thrissur

Some of the most notable temples are:Thiruvananthapuram Padmanabhaswamy Temple, Thiruvallam Sree Parasurama Swami Temple, Janardhanaswamy Temple, Vellayani Devi Temple, Pazhaya Sreekanteswaram Temple, Ananthapura Lake Temple, Sabarimala Ayyappa Temple, Angadipuram Thirumandhamkunnu Temple, Alathiyoor Hanuman Temple, Bhayankavu Bhagavathi Temple, Kadampuzha Devi Temple, Keraladeshpuram Temple, Panniyur Sri Varahamurthy Temple, Sukapuram Dakshinamoorthy Temple, Thirunavaya Navamukunda Temple, Triprangode Siva Temple, Tali Shiva Temple, Trikkandiyur Siva Temple, Thrissur Vadakkunnathan Temple, Guruvayur Temple, Thriprayar Temple, Lokanarkavu Temple, Thirunelli Temple, Aranmula Parthasarathy Temple, Chottanikkara Temple, Chengannur Mahadeva Temple, Parassinikadavu Muthappan Temple, Chettikulangara Devi Temple, Mannarasala Temple, Chakkulathukavu Temple, Thiruvalla Sreevallabha Temple, Kaviyoor Mahadevar Temple, Parumala Panayannarkavu Temple, Sree Poornathrayesa Temple, Kodungallur Bhagavathy Temple, Trikkur Mahadeva Temple, Manalarkavu Devi Temple and Rajarajeshwara Temple. Temples in Kerala follow elaborate rituals and traditionally only priests from the Nambudiri caste could be appointed as priests in major temples. But in 2017 as per the state government's decision, the priests from the historically backward caste communities are now being appointed as priests.

Malayali Hindus practice ceremonies such as Chorunu (first feeding of rice to a child) and Vidyāraṃbhaṃ.

== Islam ==
- Islam is the second-largest practiced religion in Kerala (26.56%), only surpassed by Hinduism. The calculated Muslim population (Indian Census, 2011) in Kerala state is 8,873,472.
- Most of the Muslims in Kerala follow the Shāfiʿī School (Sunni Islam), followed by Salafi movement.
- Muslims in Kerala share a common language (Malayalam) with the Hindus and rest of the population and have a culture commonly regarded as the Malayali culture.
- A number of different communities, some of them having distant ethnic roots, exist as status groups in Kerala.

=== History ===
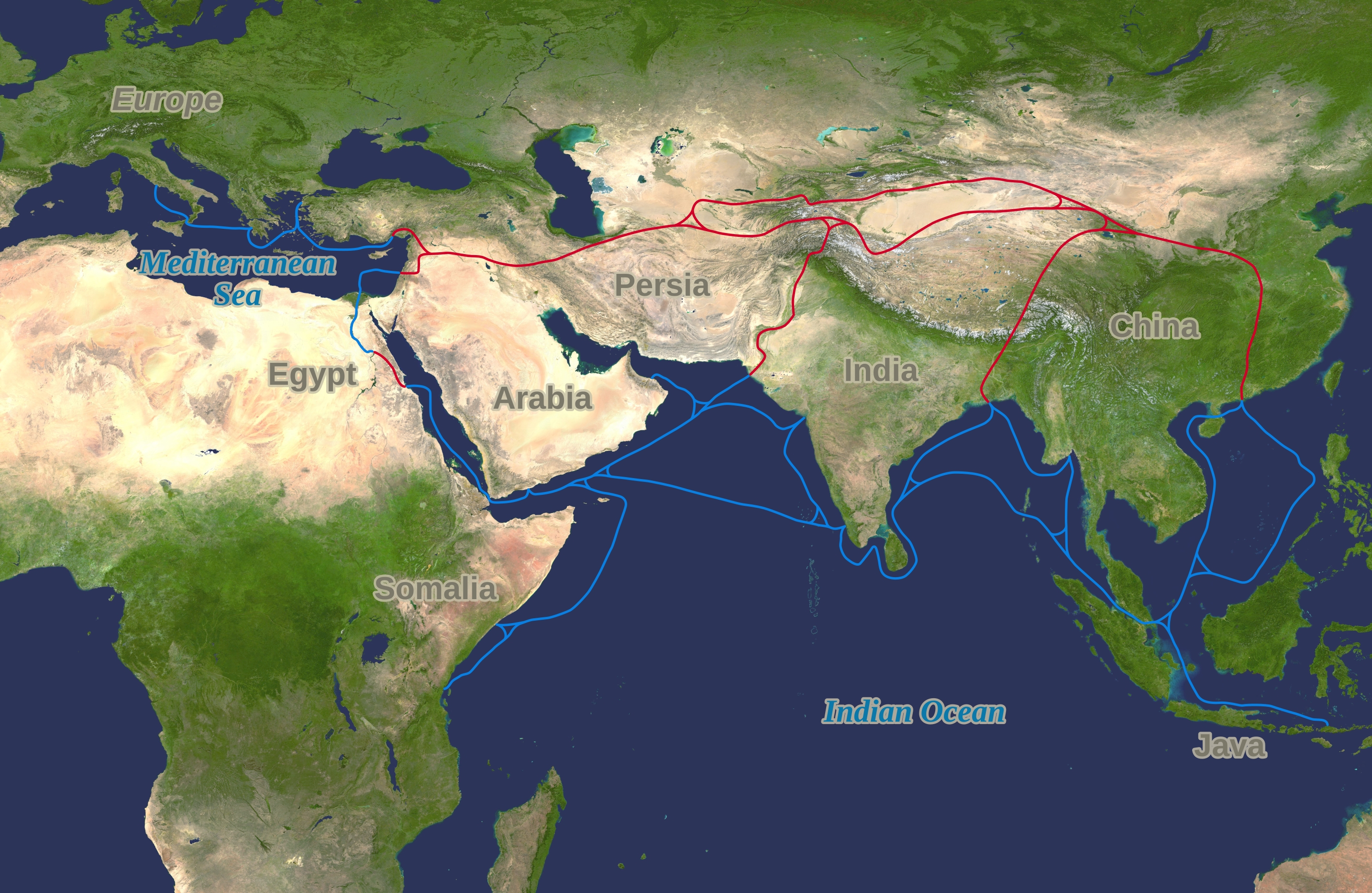
Ancient Silk Road map showing the then trade routes. The spice trade was mainly along the water routes (blue).

Names, routes and locations of the Periplus of the Erythraean Sea (1st century CE)

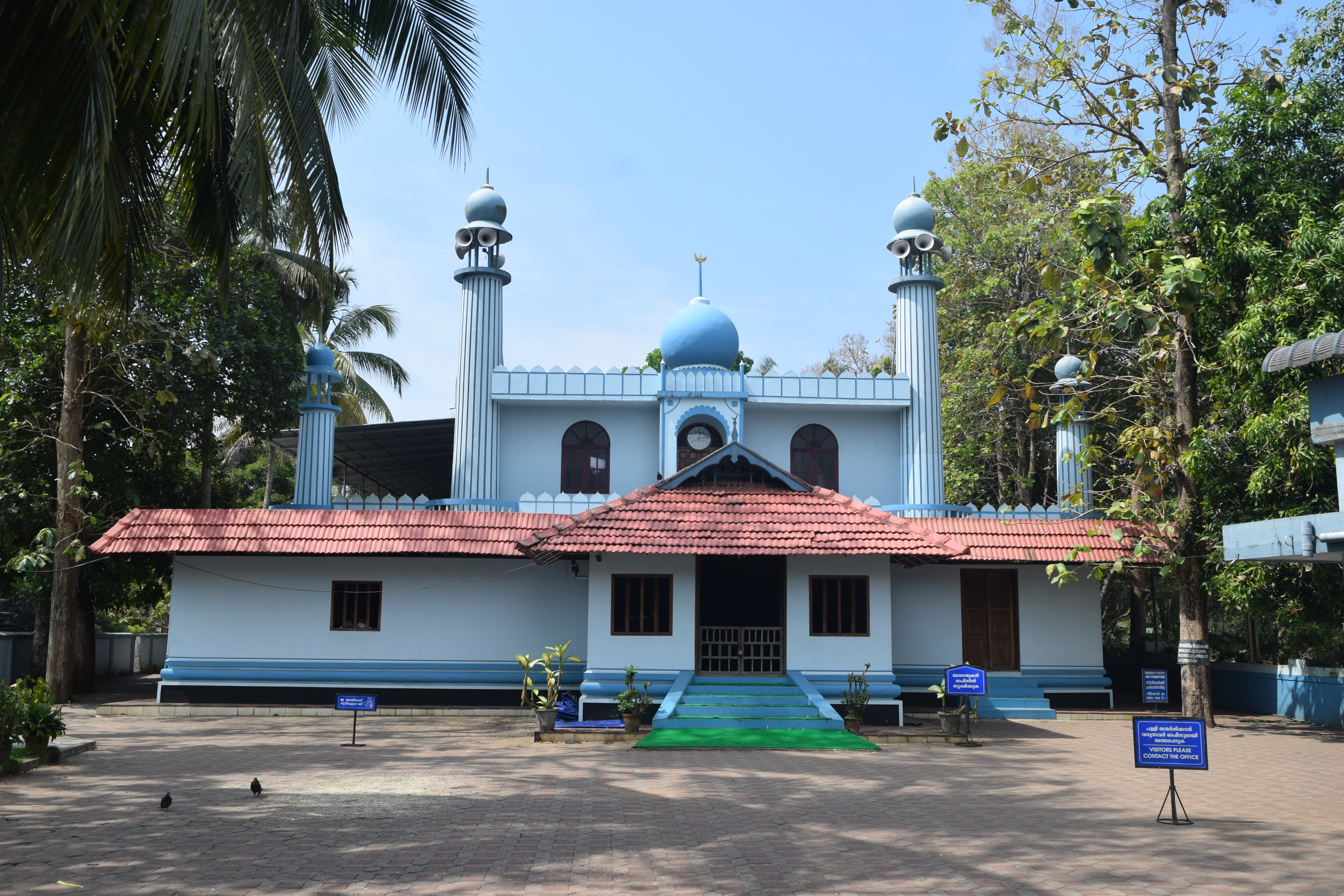
Cheraman Juma Masjid at Kodungallur, Thrissur

Kerala has been a major spice exporter since 3000 BCE, according to Sumerian records and it is still referred to as the "Garden of Spices" or as the "Spice Garden of India". Kerala's spices attracted ancient Arabs, Babylonians, Assyrians and Egyptians to the Malabar Coast in the 3rd and 2nd millennia BCE. Phoenicians established trade with Kerala during this period. Arabs and Phoenicians were the first to enter Malabar Coast to trade Spices. The Arabs on the coasts of Yemen, Oman, and the Persian Gulf, must have made the first long voyage to Kerala and other eastern countries. They must have brought the Cinnamon of Kerala to the Middle East. The Greek historian Herodotus (5th century BCE) records that in his time the cinnamon spice industry was monopolized by the Egyptians and the Phoenicians.

Islam arrived in Kerala, a part of the larger Indian Ocean rim, via spice and silk traders from the Middle East. Historians do not rule out the possibility of Islam being introduced to Kerala as early as the seventh century CE. Northern Kerala Muslims are generally referred to as the Mappilas. Mappilas are but one among the many communities that forms the Muslim population of Northern Kerala. The first Indian mosque was built in 624 AD at Kodungallur. According to Qissat Shakarwati Farmad, the Masjids at Kodungallur, Kollam, Madayi, Barkur, Mangalore, Kasaragod, Kannur, Dharmadam, Panthalayini, and Chaliyam, were built during the era of Malik Dinar, and they are among the oldest Masjids in the Indian subcontinent. It is believed that Malik Dinar died at Thalangara in Kasaragod town. According to popular tradition, Islam was brought to Lakshadweep islands, situated just to the west of Malabar Coast, by Ubaidullah in 661 CE. His grave is believed to be located on the island of Andrott. A few Umayyad (661–750 AD) coins were discovered from Kothamangalam in the eastern part of Ernakulam district.

The known earliest mention about Muslims of Kerala is in the Quilon Syrian copper plates of the 9th century CE, granted by the ruler of Kollam. A number of foreign accounts have mentioned about the presence of considerable Muslim population in the Malabar Coast. Arab writers such as Al-Masudi of Baghdad (896–956 AD), Muhammad al-Idrisi (1100–1165 AD), Abulfeda (1273–1331 AD), and Al-Dimashqi (1256–1327 AD) mention the Muslim communities in Kerala. Some historians assume that the Mappilas can be considered as the first native, settled Muslim community in South Asia. Al-Biruni (973–1048 CE) appears to be the first writer to call Malabar Coast as Malabar. Authors such as Ibn Khordadbeh and Al-Baladhuri mention Malabar ports in their works. The Arab writers had called this place Malibar, Manibar, Mulibar, and Munibar. Malabar is reminiscent of the word Malanad which means the land of hills. According to William Logan, the word Malabar comes from a combination of the Dravidian word Mala (hill) and the Persian/Arabic word Barr (country/continent). The Kodungallur Mosque, has a granite foundation exhibiting 11th–12th century architectural style. The Arabic inscription on a copper slab within the Madayi Mosque in Kannur records its foundation year as 1124 CE.

The Muslims were a major financial power to be reckoned with in the old kingdoms of Kerala and had great political influence in the Hindu royal courts. Travellers have recorded the considerably huge presence of Muslim merchants and settlements of sojourning traders in most of the ports of Kerala. Immigration, intermarriage and missionary activity/conversion – secured by the common interest in the spice trade – helped in this development. Muslim merchant magnates owning ships, spread their shipping and trading business interests across the Indian Ocean. The Koyilandy Jumu'ah Mosque contains an Old Malayalam inscription written in a mixture of Vatteluttu and Grantha scripts which dates back to the 10th century CE. It is a rare surviving document recording patronage by a Hindu king (Bhaskara Ravi) to the Muslims of Kerala. A 13th century granite inscription, written in a mixture of Old Malayalam and Arabic, at Muchundi Mosque in Kozhikode mentions a donation by the king to the mosque.

The Moroccan traveller Ibn Battutah (14th century) has recorded the considerably huge presence of Muslim merchants and settlements of sojourning traders in most of the ports of Kerala. By the early decades of the 14th century, travellers speak of Calicut (Kozhikode) as the major port city in Kerala. Some of the important administrative positions in the kingdom of Zamorin of Calicut, such as that of the port commissioner, were held by Muslims. The port commissioner, the Shah Bandar, represented commercial interests of the Muslim merchants. In his account, Ibn Battutah mentions Shah Bandars in Calicut as well as Quilon (Ibrahim Shah Bandar and Muhammed Shah Bandar). The Ali Rajas of Arakkal kingdom, based at Kannur, ruled the Lakshadweep Islands. Arabs had the monopoly of trade in Malabar Coast and Indian Ocean until the Portuguese Age of Discovery.

The arrival of the Portuguese traders in Malabar Coast in the late 15th century checked the then well-established and wealthy Muslim community's progress. Following the discovery of sea route from Europe to Malabar in 1498, the Portuguese began to expand their territories and ruled the seas between Ormus and the Malabar Coast and south to Ceylon. The Tuhfat Ul Mujahideen written by Zainuddin Makhdoom II (born around 1532) of Ponnani during 16th-century CE is the first-ever known book fully based on the history of Kerala, written by a Keralite. It is written in Arabic and contains pieces of information about the resistance put up by the navy of Kunjali Marakkar alongside the Zamorin of Calicut from 1498 to 1583 against Portuguese attempts to colonize Malabar coast. It was first printed and published in Lisbon. A copy of this edition has been preserved in the library of Al-Azhar University, Cairo. Tuhfatul Mujahideen also describes the history of Mappila Muslim community of Kerala as well as the general condition of Malabar Coast in the 16th century CE. With the end of Portuguese era, Arabs lost their monopoly of trade in Malabar Coast. By the mid-18th century the majority of the Muslims of Kerala became landless labourers, poor fishermen and petty traders, and the community was in "a psychological retreat". The subsequent partisan rule of English East India Company authorities brought the land-less Muslim peasants of Malabar District into a condition of destitution, and this led to a series of uprisings (against the Hindu landlords and British administration). The series of violence eventually exploded as the Mappila Uprising (1921–22).

A large number of Muslims of Kerala found extensive employment in the Persian Gulf countries in the following years (c. 1970s). This widespread participation in the "Gulf Rush" produced huge economic and social benefits for the community. Great influx funds from the earnings of the employed followed. Issues such as widespread poverty, unemployment and educational backwardness began to change.

=== Politics ===
Distribution of Muslims in Kerala – District-wise.

Politically speaking, Muslims in Kerala have exhibited more unanimity than any other major community in modern-day Kerala.

- Ever since the country gained independence British rule in 1947, an overwhelming majority of Muslims at the former Malabar District (Northern Kerala) has supported the Muslim League.
- In southern Kerala, the community generally supported the Indian National Congress and in northern Kerala a small proportion vote Communist.

== Christianity ==
Relationship of the Nasrani groups.

Christianity is followed by 18.38% of the population of Kerala. Christianity in Kerala has traditions dating back to the first century AD, many of which are similar to the traditions of the Malabari Jews, who claim to have lived in Kerala since the time of King Solomon. The visit of St. Thomas is still a matter of dispute among historians. According to traditional accounts, Saint Thomas the Apostle visited Muziris in Kerala in the first century around 52 AD and proselytized some of the then settled Cochin Jewish families and some Upper castes, they became the present "Mar Thoma Suriyani Nasrani" or Saint Thomas Syrian Christians. According to traditional accounts, on the onset of an invasion Thomas is believed to have left northwest India traveled by vessel to the Malabar Coast, possibly visiting southeast Arabia and Socotra en route, and landing at the former flourishing port of Muziris (modern-day North Paravur and Kodungalloor). Evidence such as the Acts of Thomas, one of the first accounts of the life of Thomas, say he died in Northwest India in the Indo-Parthian Kingdom, at the hands of the monarch Misdaeus, thought to be Abdagases I, a viceroy of the Gondopharnes in Sistan, modern day southern Afghanistan. This conclusion is supported by Ephrem the Syrian and his contemporaries, Eusebius and Origen, who testify that Thomas evangelized the Parthians. Modern scholars also support this point of view, and there is no evidence suggesting Thomas was ever in Kerala, or South India in general. According to Knanaya Christians, an endogamous ethnic group found among the Saint Thomas Christian community of Kerala, their existence in Kerala is traced back to the arrival of the Syrian merchant Thomas of Cana (Knāi Thoma) who led a migration of Syriac Christians (Jewish-Christians) from Mesopotamia to India in the 4th or 9th century. The Knanaya claim descent from Thomas of Cana and those who came with him. The communities arrival was recorded on the Thomas of Cana copper plates which existed in Kerala until the 17th century after which point they were taken to Portugal by the Franciscan Order. Before the arrival of Europeans in Kerala there were only Marthoma Nasranis also called as Malankara Syrian Christians due to its historical, religious, and liturgical connection to Syriac Christianity. Marthoma Nasranis remained as an independent group, and they got their bishops from Church of the East until the advent of Portuguese and British colonialists. The first Roman Catholic Diocese in India was founded at Quilon in the year 1329 with the Catalan Dominican friar Jordanus Catalani as first Bishop. The caste system became prevalent in Kerala later than any other parts of India after fourth and fifth century AD. The Nasranis were given special status outside the Varna system. Like Brahmins they were allowed to sit in front of Kings, ride on horse or elephants, to collect taxes. The Marthoma Nasranis back then also has the role of pollution neutralizers i.e., if a lower caste person hand over a substance to a Nasrani and if he in turn gives it to an upper caste, say for example Brahmin, then there would be no pollution for that Brahmin.

The arrival of Europeans in the 15th century and discontent with Portuguese interference in religious matters fomented schism into Catholic and Orthodox communities. Further schism and rearrangements led to the formation of the other Indian Churches. Latin Catholics of Kerala has protracted over eleven centuries and the work of evangelization was revived by the western missionaries in the 13th century. Anglo-Indian Christian communities formed around this time as Europeans and natives intermarried. Protestantism took a stronghold in Kerala with missionary activity during British rule.

Denominations among all Christians in Kerala
1. Syro-Malabar (40.2%)
2. Syro-Malankara (7.60%)
3. Malankara Jacobite Syrian Orthodox (8.00%)
4. Malankara Orthodox Syrian (7.90%)
5. Syrian Marthoma (6.60%)
6. Syrian Chaldean (0.43%)
7. CSI (4.50%)
8. Pentecost (4.30%)
9. Dalit Christian (2.60%)
10. Latin Catholic (13.2%)
11. Others (5.47%)

The 2011 Indian census found a total of 6,411,269 Christians in Kerala, with their various denominations as stated: Saint Thomas Christians (Syro-Malabar Church, Syro-Malankara Catholic Church, Malankara Jacobite Syrian Orthodox Church, Malankara Orthodox Syrian Church, CSI Syrian Christians, Mar Thoma Syrian Church, Pentecostal Syrian Christians, St. Thomas Evangelical Church of India, Chaldean Syrian Church and Malabar Independent Syrian Church) constituted 70.73% of the Christians of Kerala, followed by Latin Catholics at 13.3%, Pentecostals at 4.3%, CSI at 4.5%, Dalit Christians at 2.6% and other Protestant groups (such as Lutheran, Calvinist and other charismatic churches) at 5.9%.

The Saint Thomas Christians (Nasrani) of Kerala primarily belongs to the churches which use the East Syriac Rite (Syro Malabar Church and Chaldean Syrian Church) and West Syriac Rite (Jacobite Syrian Christian Church, Malankara Orthodox Syrian Church, Mar Thoma Syrian Church, St. Thomas Evangelical Church of India, Syro-Malankara Catholic Church and the Malabar Independent Syrian Church). CSI Syrian Christians follow the Anglican rite. Pentecostal Saint Thomas Christians, like other Pentecostals, are riteless (nonliturgical). The Saint Thomas Christians form 70.73% of the Christians of Kerala and 12.5% of the total population of Kerala.

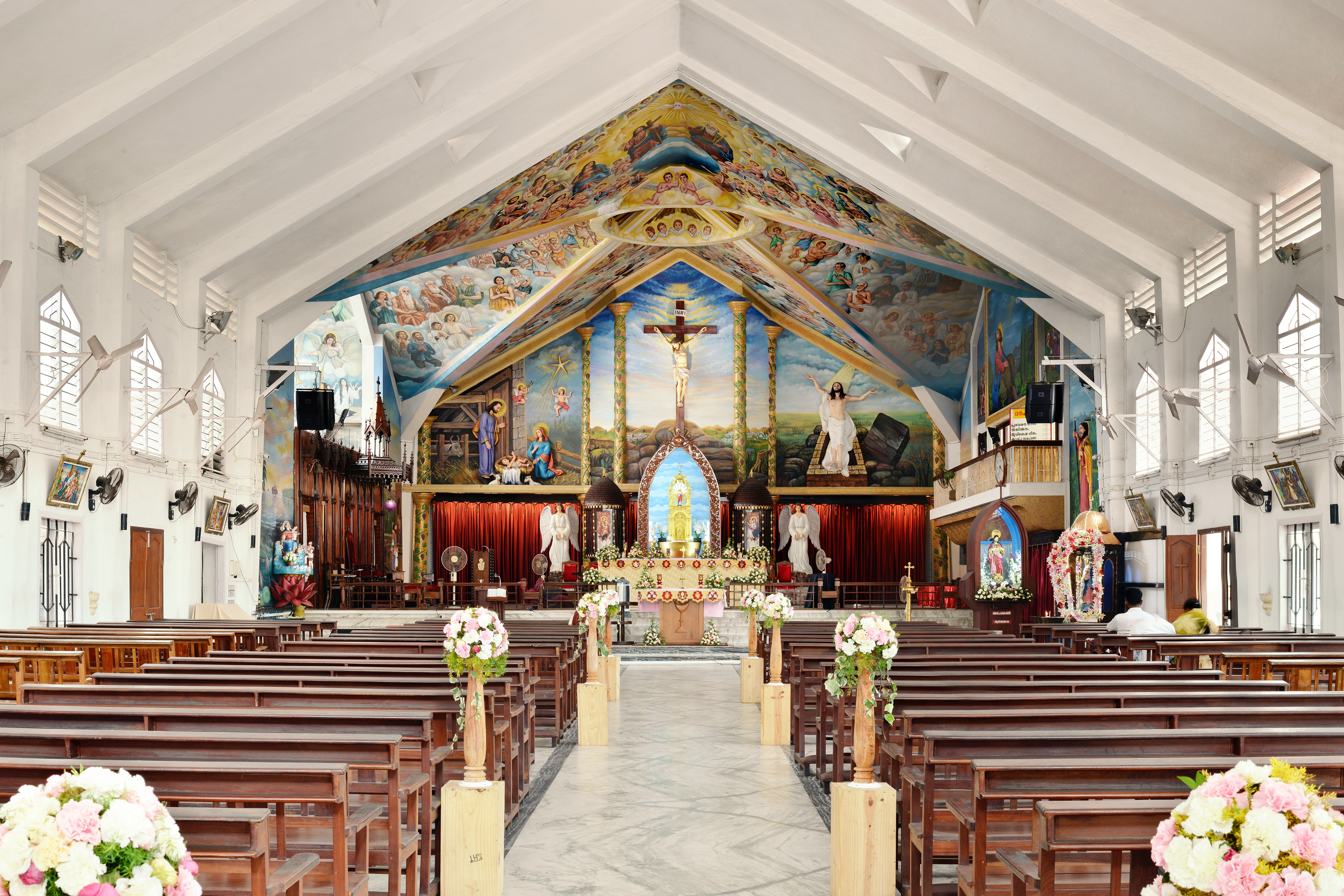
St. Mary's Syro Malabar Catholic Basilica – Ernakulam

Around 61% of Christians in the state are Catholics which includes the Eastern Syrian Catholics (Syro-Malabar Church and Syro-Malankara Catholic Church) and the Latin Catholics of Kerala. The Oriental Orthodox Churches are Malankara Orthodox Syrian Church and Malankara Jacobite Syriac Orthodox Church. The Malankara Marthoma Syrian Church is an Oriental Protestant church. The Church of South India belong to the Anglican Communion. Major Pentecostal denominations in Kerala include the India Pentecostal Church of God, Assemblies of God in India, Church of God (Full Gospel) in India, and The Pentecostal Mission. There has been a strong presence of other Protestant groups in southern Kerala such as the Church of South India and The Salvation Army that are typically based on Anglican beliefs and trace their origins to British rule. They have a significant presence in Neyyattinkara taluk and Pathanamthitta district.The Largest Christian gathering in Asia is in Kerala.

In 2023, the BBC reported on the Christian tradition of photographing funerals in Kerala.

== Judaism ==
Judaism arrived in Kerala with spice traders, possibly as early as the 7th century BC. There is no consensus of opinion on the date of the arrival of the first Jews in India. The tradition of the Cochin Jews maintains that after 72 AD, after the destruction of the Second Temple of Jerusalem, 10,000 Jews migrated to Kerala.

The only verifiable historical evidence about the Kerala Jews goes back only to the Jewish Copper Plate Grant of Bhaskara Ravi Varman in 1000 AD. This document records the royal gift of rights and privileges to the Jewish Chief of Anjuvannam Joseph Rabban. Later in the 16th century many Jews from Portugal and Spain settled in Cochin. These Jews were called white Jews as opposed to the native black Jews.

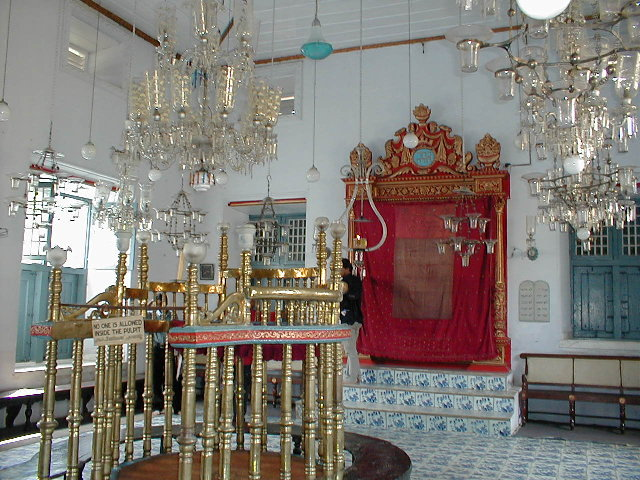
The Paradesi Synagogue in Kochi

The Portuguese did not look favorably on the Jews. They destroyed the Jewish settlement in kodungallur and sacked the Jewish town in Cochin and partially destroyed the famous Cochin Synagogue in 1661. However, the Dutch were more tolerant and allowed the Jews to pursue their normal life and trade in Cochin. According to the testimony of the Dutch Jew, Moses Pereira De Paiva, in 1686 there were 10 synagogues and nearly 500 Jewish families in Cochin. Later Britishers too were tolerant. The Jews were protected. After the creation of the State of Israel in 1948, most Jews decided to emigrate to Israel. Most of the emigrants to Israel between 1948 and 1955 were from the community of black Jews and brown Jews; they are known as Cochini in Israel. Since the 1960s, only a few hundred Jews (mostly white Jews) remained in Kerala with only two synagogues open for service: the Pardesi Synagogue in Matancherry built in 1567 and the synagogue in Parur.

== Jainism ==
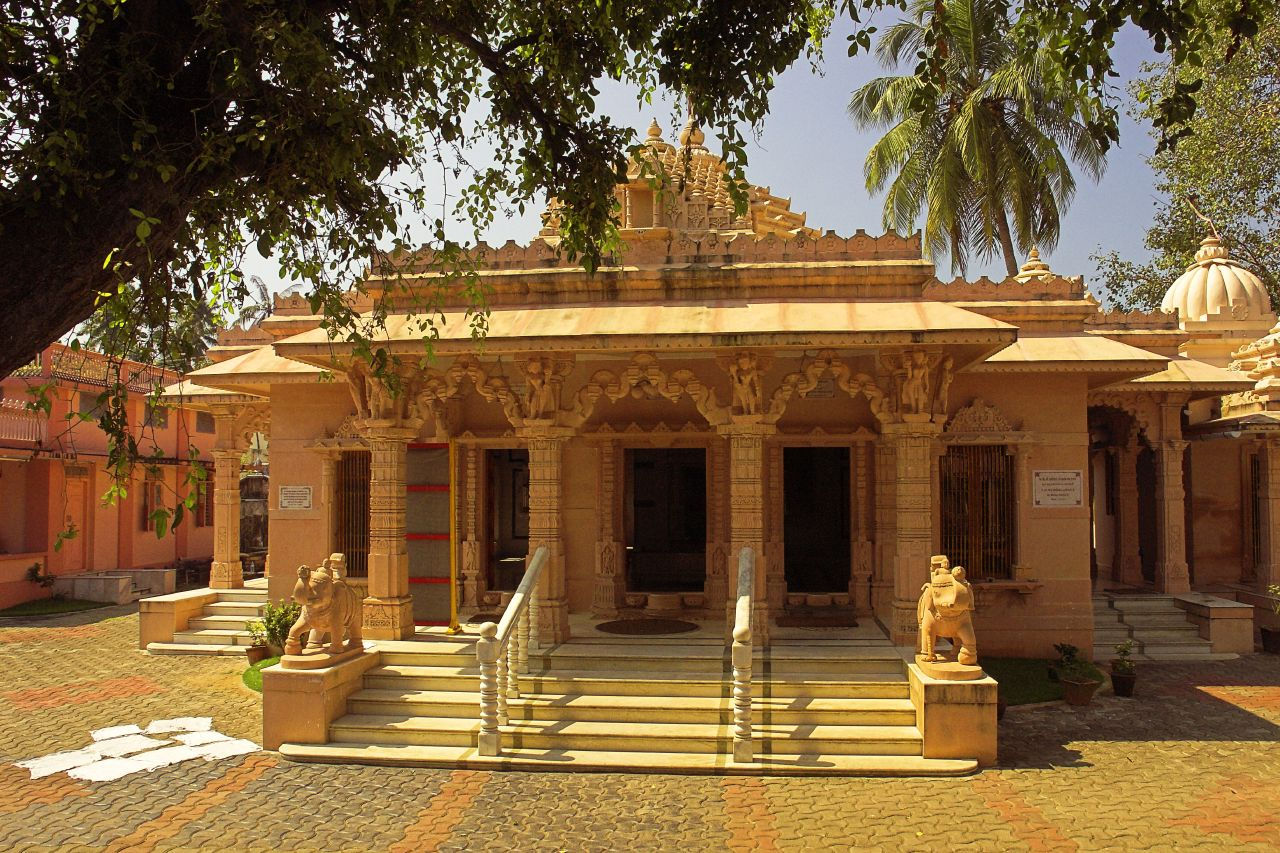
Marwari Jain Temple in Kochi

Jainism, one of the three most ancient Indian religious traditions still in existence, has a very small presence (0.01%) in Kerala, in south India. According to the 2011 India Census, Kerala only has around 4500 Jains, most of them in the city of Cochin and in Wayanad district.

Medieval Jain inscriptions are mostly found on the borders of Kerala proper, such Wynad in north-east, Alathur in the Palghat Gap and Chitharal in Kanyakumari district. Epigraphical evidence suggests that the shrine at "Tirukkunavay", perhaps located near Cochin, was the major Jain temple in medieval Kerala (from c. 9th century AD). The so-called "Rules of the Tirukkunavay Temple" provided model and precedent for all other Jain temples of Kerala. A number of images of Mahavira, Padmavati, and Parsvanatha have been recovered from Kerala.

Some of the Jain temples in Kerala were taken over by the Hindus at a later stage. The temple images are worshiped as Hindu gods and considered as part of the Hindu pantheon. It is not uncommon for Hindus and Jains to worship their deities in the same temple.

== Buddhism ==
Buddhism probably flourished for 200 years (650–850) in Kerala. The Paliyam Copper Plate of the Ay King, Varaguna (885–925 AD), shows that the Buddhists benefited from royal patronage in the 10th century.

The religion's popularity declined following the onset of Advaita Vedanta, propagated by sage Shankaracharya.

However, there remain Buddhist sites and traditions across Kerala.

== Parsi (Zoroastrianism) ==
There were a number of Parsi families settled in Kerala, particularly around Kozhikode and Thalassery area. They practiced Zoroastrianism and even built the 160-year-old dadgah (fire temple) at S. M. Street, Kozhikode which is still in existence. They were mostly wealthy families who immigrated during the 18th century from Gujarat and Bombay. The community included famous families such as the Hirjis or Marshalls. Some famous Malayali Parsis included the reputed Dr. Kobad Mogaseb, who was the first medical doctor from Kozhikode who graduated from London, as well as Kaikose Rudreshan who funded the Basel Evangelical Mission Parsi High School, Thalassery.

== Tribal and other religious faiths ==
Various groups classified as tribes in Kerala still dominate various remote and hilly areas of Kerala. They have retained various rituals and practices of their ancestors despite influences of mainstream religions.

== Demographics ==
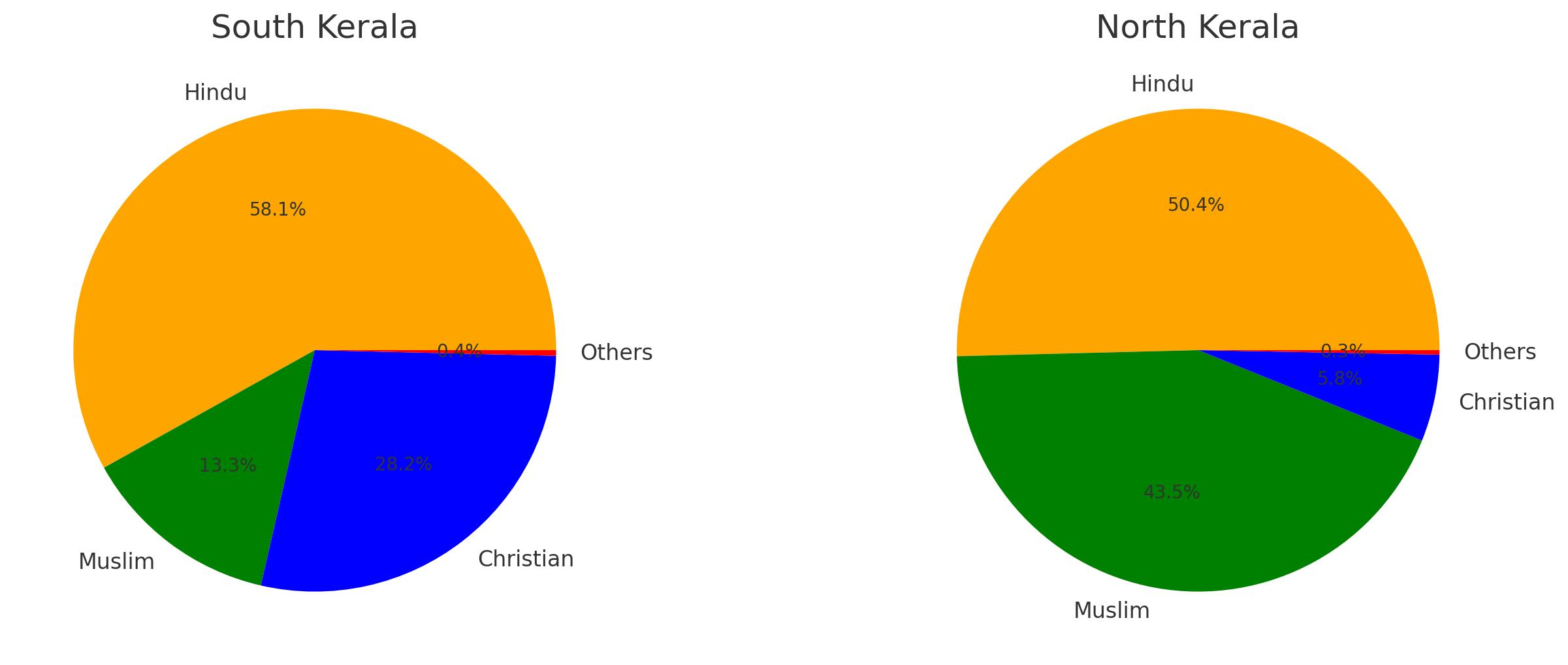

Religious demographics of Kerala (1901–2011)
	Hindus		Decadal growth rate (%)	Muslims		Decadal growth rate (%)	Christians		Decadal growth rate (%)	Total population		Decadal growth rate (%)
1901	4,378,305	68.5%	N/A	1,119,473	17.5%	N/A	891,767	13.9%	N/A	6,389,545	100.0%	N/A
1911	4,762,393	66.8%	+8.77	1,263,602	17.7%	+12.87	1,101,289	15.5%	+23.50	7,127,284	100.0%	+11.55
1921	5,052,039	64.9%	+6.08	1,360,180	17.5%	+7.64	1,376,354	17.7%	+24.98	7,788,573	100.0%	+9.28
1931	6,021,982	63.4%	+19.20	1,624,112	17.1%	+19.40	1,856,024	19.5%	+34.85	9,502,118	100.0%	+22.00
1941	6,699,600	61.8%	+11.25	1,883,786	17.4%	+11.60	2,263,888	20.9%	+21.98	10,847,274	100.0%	+14.16
1951	8,344,351	61.6%	+24.55	2,374,598	17.5%	+26.05	2,825,720	20.9%	+24.82	13,544,669	100.0%	+24.87
1961	10,282,568	60.9%	+23.23	3,027,639	17.9%	+27.50	3,587,365	21.2%	+26.95	16,897,572	100.0%	+24.75
1971	12,683,277	59.4%	+23.35	4,162,718	19.5%	+37.49	4,494,089	21.1%	+25.28	21,340,084	100.0%	+26.29
1981	14,801,347	58.2%	+16.70	5,409,687	21.3%	+30.00	5,233,865	20.6%	+16.46	25,444,899	100.0%	+19.24
1991	16,668,587	57.3%	+12.62	6,788,354	23.3%	+25.49	5,621,510	19.3%	+7.41	29,078,451	100.0%	+14.28
2001	17,920,105	56.3%	+7.51	7,863,842	24.7%	+15.84	6,057,427	19.0%	+7.75	31,841,374	100.0%	+9.50
2011	18,282,492	54.9%	+2.02	8,873,472	26.6%	+12.84	6,141,269	18.4%	+1.38	33,406,061	100.0%	+4.91
Indicates least growth rate			Indicates most growth rate			Source: Census of India (1901–2011)						

=== Religious demographics of Travancore (1816–1941) ===
Religious Demographics of Travancore (1816–1941)
Census year	Total population	Hindus		Christians		Muslims	
1816 – 1820	906,587	752,371	82.99%	112,158	12.37%	42,058	4.64%
1881	2,401,158	1,755,610	73.12%	498,542	20.76%	146,909	6.12%
1891	2,557,736	1,871,864	73.18%	526,911	20.60%	158,823	6.21%
1901	2,952,157	2,063,798	69.91%	697,387	23.62%	190,566	6.46%
1911	3,428,975	2,298,390	67.03%	903,868	26.36%	226,617	6.61%
1921	4,006,062	2,562,301	63.96%	1,172,934	29.27%	270,478	6.75%
1931	5,095,973	3,137,795	61.57%	1,604,475	31.46%	353,274	6.93%
1941	6,070,018	3,671,480	60.49%	1,963,808	32.35%	434,150	7.15%

=== Religious demographics of Malabar District (1871–1951) ===
Religious demographics of Malabar District (1871&1951)
Religion		1871	1951
1	Hinduism	72.43%	63.25%
2	Islam	25.72%	33.49%
3	Christianity	1.43%	3.24%

Population by religion, per 2011 census

Religion	Population	%	Population below 6 yrs of age	%	Dist. with highest population	Dist. with lowest population	Population growth since 2001
Hindus	18,282,492	54.73	1,632,777	47.01	Thiruvananthapuram	Wayanad	2.23%
Muslims	8,873,472	26.56	1,276,104	36.74	Malappuram	Pathanamthitta	12.84%
Christians	6,141,269	18.38	546,897	15.75	Ernakulam	Malappuram	1.38%

Population by religion, per 2001 census

Religion	Population	%	Population below 6 yrs of age	%	Dist. with highest population	Dist. with lowest population	Population growth since 1991	Children born per women (TFR)
Hindus	17,883,449	56.2	1,932,504	50.78	Thiruvananthapuram	Waynad	7.29%	1.64
Muslims	7,863,342	24.3	1,178,880	30.99	Malappuram	Pathanamthitta	15.84%	2.46
Christians	6,057,427	19	677,878	17.82	Ernakulam	Malappuram	7.75%	1.88

Population from 2001 and 2011 census, with percentage by religion for each district

Districts	Population (2001)	Population (2011)	Percent Hindus	Percent Muslims	Percent Christians
Kasargod	1,203,342	1,307,375	55.83%	37.24%	6.68%
Kannur	2,412,365	2,523,003	59.83%	29.43%	10.41%
Wayanad	786,627	817,420	49.48%	28.65%	21.34%
Kozhikode	2,878,498	3,086,293	56.21%	39.24%	4.26%
Malappuram	3,629,640	4,112,920	27.60%	70.24%	1.98%
Palakkad	2,617,072	2,809,934	66.76%	28.93%	4.07%
Thrissur	2,975,440	3,121,200	58.42%	17.07%	24.27%
Ernakulam	3,098,378	3,282,388	45.99%	15.67%	38.03%
Idukki	1,128,605	1,108,974	48.86%	7.41%	43.42%
Kottayam	1,952,901	1,974,551	49.81%	6.41%	43.48%
Alappuzha	2,105,349	2,127,789	68.64%	10.55%	20.45%
Pathanamthitta	1,231,577	1,197,412	56.93%	4.59%	38.12%
Kollam	2,584,118	2,635,375	64.42%	19.29%	15.99%
Thiruvananthapuram	3,234,707	3,301,427	66.94%	13.72%	19.10%

=== Live births by religion ===
Births by religion in Kerala in 2019
1. Islam in Kerala (44.4%)
2. Hinduism in Kerala (41.0%)
3. Christianity in Kerala (14.3%)
4. Others (0.29%)
5. Not Stated (0.04%)

Kerala's percentage distribution of live births by religion of the family
Year	Hindu	%	Muslim	%	Christian	%	Others	%	Not stated	%	Total	%
2005	262,976	47.04%	191,675	34.28%	98,353	17.59%	1,098	0.19%	4,980	0.89%	559,082	100%
2006	258,119	46.40%	196,493	35.32%	96,469	17.34%	1,545	0.28%	3,700	0.66%	556,326	100%
2007	250,094	45.88%	183,796	33.71%	98,220	18.02%	6,108	1.12%	6,936	1.27%	545,154	100%
2008	241,305	45.04%	194,583	36.32%	94,175	17.58%	5,151	0.96%	524	0.10%	535,738	100%
2009	247,707	45.51%	204,711	37.61%	90,451	16.62%	704	0.13%	775	0.14%	544,348	100%
2010	246,297	45.03%	209,276	38.26%	88,936	16.26%	651	0.12%	1,806	0.33%	546,964	100%
2011	248,610	44.37%	214,099	38.21%	94,664	16.90%	2,671	0.48%	224	0.04%	560,268	100%
2012	214,591	38.99%	175,892	31.96%	102,546	18.63%	57,215	10.39%	167	0.03%	536,352	100%
2013	236,420	44.08%	214,257	39.96%	84,660	15.78%	869	0.16%	146	0.02%	534,458	100%
2014	231,031	43.23%	218,437	40.87%	83,616	15.65%	1,178	0.22%	196	0.03%	516,013	100%
2015	221,220	42.87%	213,865	41.45%	79,565	15.42%	933	0.18%	430	0.08%	496,292	100%
2016	207,831	41.88%	211,182	42.55%	76,205	15.35%	852	0.18%	222	0.04%	503,588	100%
2017	210,071	41.71%	216,525	43.00%	75,335	14.96%	1,497	0.30%	160	0.03%	488,174	100%
2018	203,158	41.61%	213,805	43.80%	69,844	14.31%	1,214	0.25%	153	0.03%	480,113	100%
2019	197,061	41.04%	212,933	44.35%	68,596	14.28%	1,408	0.29%	115	0.04%	446,891	100%
2020	185,411	41.49%	196,138	43.89%	62,265	13.93%	2,967	0.66%	110	0.02%	419,767	100%
2021	181,396	43.21%	169,296	40.33%	59,766	14.24%	9,143	2.18%	166	0.04%	439,742	100%
2022	177,037	39.96%	200,325	45.22%	64,168	14.48%	1,235	9.58%	267	0.06%	443,032	100%
2023	158,399	40.28%	176,312	44.84%	56,810	14.45%	1,294	3.29%	416	0.10%	393,231	100%
2024	136,163	39.49%	159,088	46.14%	48,476	14.06%	318	0.09%	721	0.21%	344,766	100%

== See also ==
- Religion in India
- Religion in Malabar
- Religion in Travancore
- Religious education in Kerala
