= Christianity in Kerala =

Third-largest practiced religion in Kerala

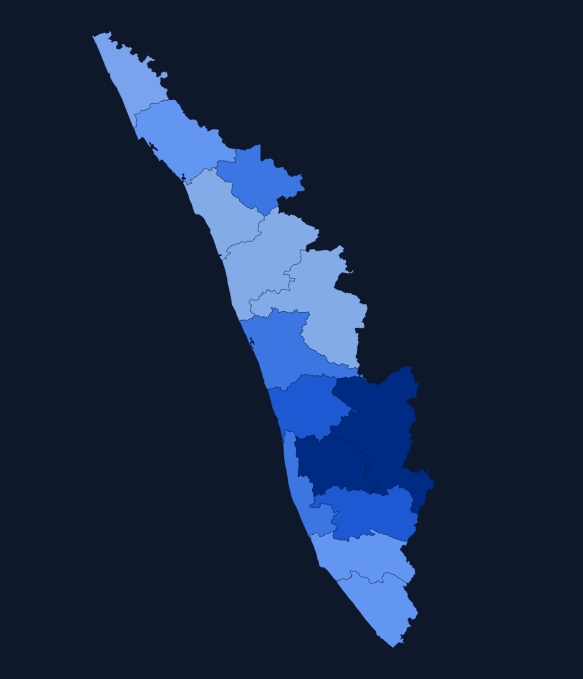
Percentage of Christians by District

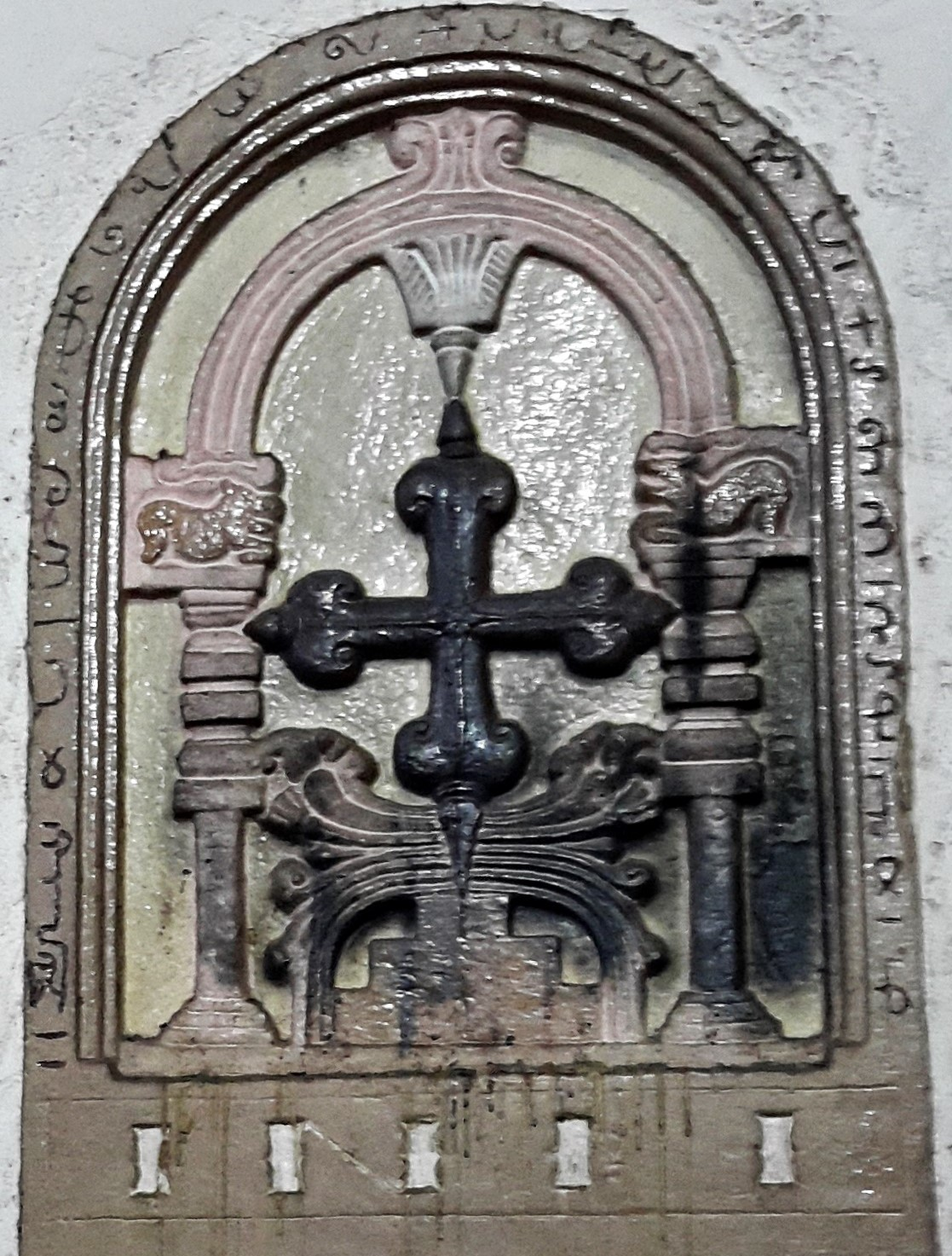
Saint Thomas Cross (Mar Thoma Sleeha) indigenous to the Saint Thomas Syrian Christian community

St.Thomas Christians

Christianity in Kerala is one of the oldest continuous Christian traditions in the world dating back to AD 52. It is the third-largest practiced religion in the state, accounting for 18% of the population according to the 2001 Indian census. According to traditional accounts, Thomas the Apostle sailed to the Malabar region in 52 AD and introduced Christianity to the area. However there is no historical evidence of Saint Thomas ever reaching Kerala. Although a minority, the Christian population of Kerala is proportionally much larger than that of India as a whole. A significant portion of the Indian Christian population resides in the state.

== History ==
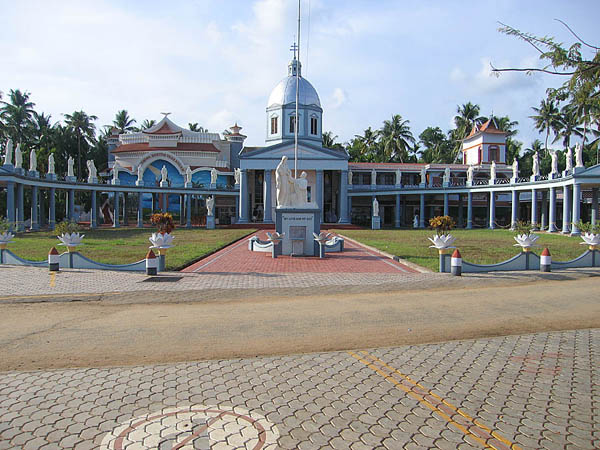
Mar Thoma Sleeha Pilgrim Church, Kodungalloor where the relics of the right hand of the apostle is kept and venerated. This new church is built where it is believed that the first of the seven churches was built by Thomas in AD 52.

The tradition of origin among Saint Thomas Christians relates to the arrival of Thomas, one of the 12 disciples of Jesus, at the ancient seaport Muziris on the Kerala coast in AD 52. But the visit of St. Thomas is still a matter of dispute among historians.

It is also possible for Aramaic-speaking Jews from Galilee to make a trip to Kerala in the 1st century.

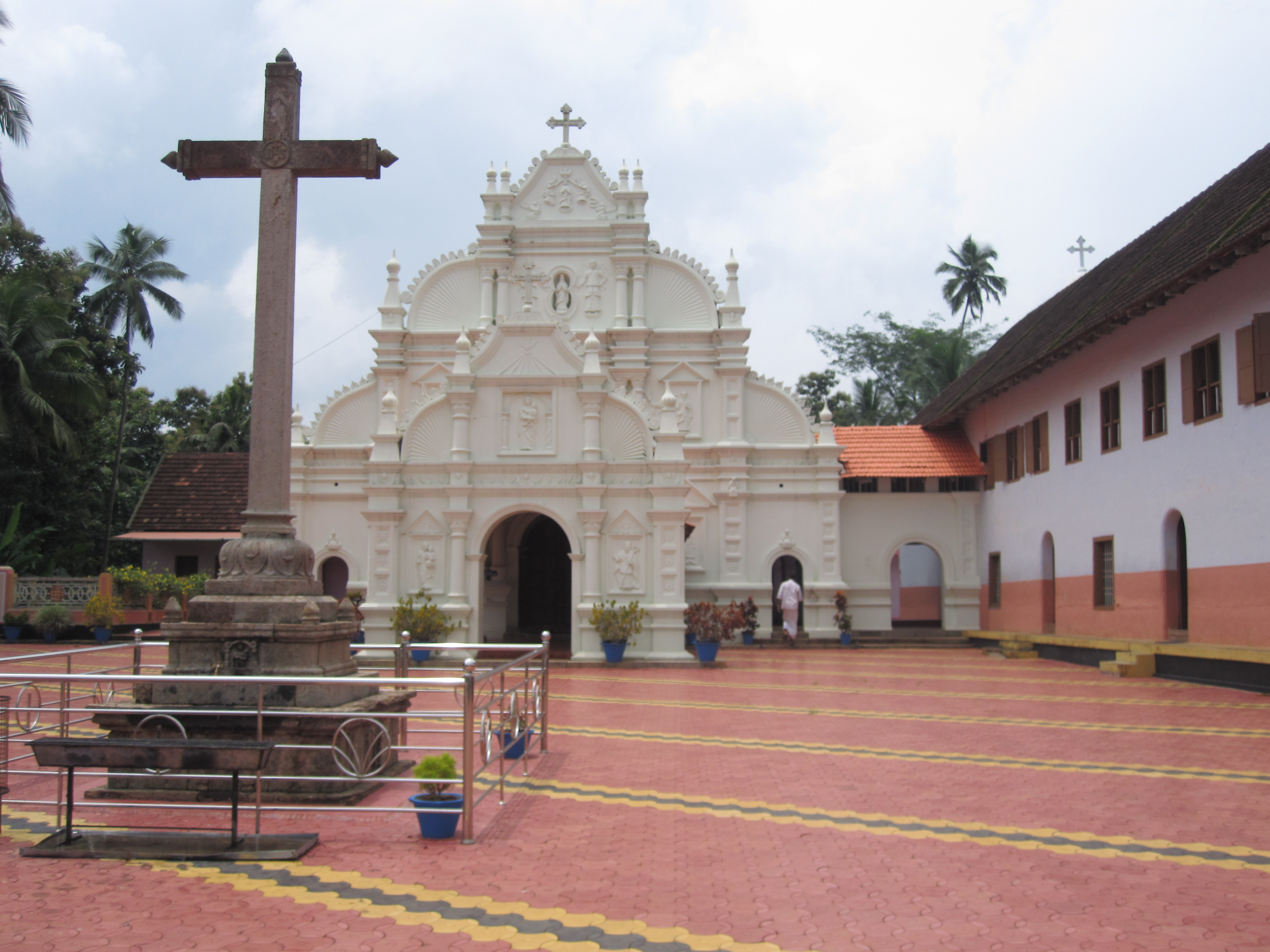
Marth Mariam Syro-Malabar Catholic Forane Church, Arakuzha was founded in 999

The earliest known source connecting the apostle to India is the Acts of Thomas, likely written in the early 3rd century, perhaps in Edessa. The text describes Thomas' efforts in bringing Christianity to Northwest India, specifically in the Indo-Parthian Kingdom. Relations with the Church of the East were heavily strengthened post AD 345 with the arrival of the Knanaya people in Kerala.

According to traditional accounts such as the "Thomma Parvam" ("Song of Thomas"), he is generally described as arriving in or around Maliankara and founding Seven Churches and half churches, or Ezharapallikal: Kodungallur, Kollam, Niranam, Nilackal (Chayal), Kokkamangalam, Kottakkavu, Palayoor, Thiruvithamcode Arappalli and Aruvithura church (half church). A number of 3rd- and 4th-century Roman writers also mention Thomas' trip to India, including Ambrose of Milan, Gregory of Nazianzus, Jerome, and Ephrem the Syrian, while Eusebius of Caesarea records that Clement of Alexandria's teacher Pantaenus from Alexandria visited a Christian community in India using the Gospel of Matthew in Hebrew language in the 2nd century. Byzantine traveller Cosmas Indicopleustes wrote of Syrian Christians he met in Malabar and Sri Lanka in the 6th century. In 883 the English king Alfred the Great reportedly sent a mission and gifts to Saint Thomas' tomb in India. During the Crusades, distorted accounts of the Saint Thomas Christians and the Nestorian Church gave rise to the European legend of Prester John.

=== Religious education ===
In 1815, British resident Colonel John Munro founded a seminary in Kottayam for the theological education of Jacobite Christian priests and invited the Anglican missionaries to teach there. From there, a connection was formed between the Church Mission Society and the Saint Thomas Christians of the Puthenkuttukar, or New Allegiance. Restrictions were imposed on Saint Thomas Christian parishes in order to start new schools, and later on the Travancore Diwan after they attempted to take over the schools owned by the community. The St. Joseph's LP School in Koonammavu was the first Catholic school for girls, and the first convent in Kerala was established in 1868 in a bamboo-mat house by Mother Eliswa, who later established more schools for girls.

== Denominations ==
Denominations among all Christians in Kerala
1. Syro-Malabar Catholic (40.2%)
2. Roman Catholic (Latin) (13.2%)
3. Malankara Orthodox Syrian Church (8.00%)
4. Jacobite Syrian Church (7.80%)
5. Syro-Malankara Catholic (7.60%)
6. Syrian Marthoma (6.60%)
7. Others (5.47%)
8. CSI (4.50%)
9. Pentecost (4.30%)
10. Dalit Christian (2.60%)
11. Chaldean Syrian Church (0.43%)

The 2011 Indian census found a total of 6,411,269 Christians in Kerala, with their various denominations as stated: Saint Thomas Christians (including multiple Catholic, Oriental Orthodox and Protestant bodies) constituted 70.73% of the Christians of Kerala, followed by Latin Catholics at 13.3%, Pentecostals at 4.3%, CSI at 4.5%, Dalit Christians at 2.6% and other Protestant groups (such as Lutheran, Calvinist and other charismatic churches) at 5.9%.

The Saint Thomas Christians (Nasrani) of Kerala primarily belong to churches which use the East Syriac Rite (Syro-Malabar Catholic Church and Chaldean Syrian Church) and West Syriac Rite (Malankara Jacobite Syrian Christian Church, Malankara Orthodox Syrian Church, Mar Thoma Syrian Church, St. Thomas Evangelical Church of India, Syro-Malankara Catholic Church and the Malabar Independent Syrian Church). The Church of South India belongs to the Anglican Communion and Saint Thomas Anglicans are theologically and liturgically similar to Anglicans elsewhere. Pentecostal Saint Thomas Christians, like other Pentecostals, are riteless (nonliturgical). As of 2005, Saint Thomas Christians composed 12.5% of the total population of Kerala.

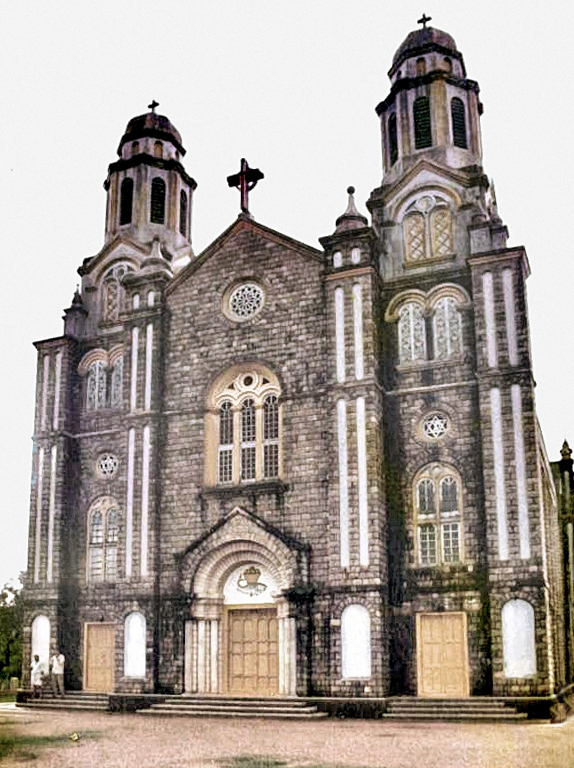
Martha Mariam Malankara Catholic Syrian Cathedral, Pattom, Trivandrum, founded in 1950.

The Mar Thoma Syrian Church and St. Thomas Evangelical Church of India are Oriental Protestant churches. The Salvation Army also maintains a presence in Kerala.

In 2016, 61% of Christians in the state were Catholics, which includes Eastern Catholics and Latin Catholics. The percentage of Catholics among Christians is the highest in Thrissur district, which are syro malabar Catholics

Major Pentecostal denominations in Kerala include the India Pentecostal Church of God, Assemblies of God in India, Church of God (Full Gospel) in India, and The Pentecostal Mission.

There are also some continuing Anglican churches that is active in Kerala like the Anglican Church of India. They exist as small communities in Kerala and they are separate from the Church of South India (CSI). Their headquarters is in Kurichy, Kottayam.

== See also ==
- Caste system among South Asian Christians
- Goan Catholics
- East Indian Catholics
- Mangalorean Catholics
- Religion in Kerala
