= Malankara Pentecostalism =

Coordinates: 8.9931°N 76.7757°E

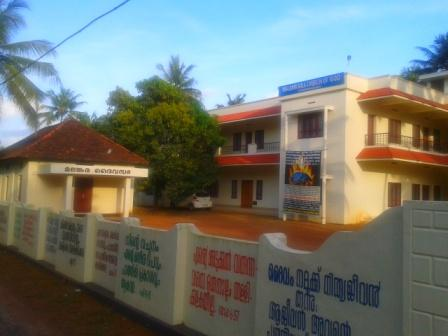
Malankara Church of God, Thrikkannamangal, Kottarakkara

Malankara Pentecostalism originally known as Malankara Poorna Suvisesha Sabha is the first Pentecostal movement in Kerala, India which gave birth to many Pentecostal denominations in Kerala.

== Etymology ==
The name "Malankara" is re-fixed for most of the orthodox churches of Kerala, in south-west India. Malankara is a cognate of Maliankara, a place near Muziris, where St. Thomas the Apostle is said to have arrived in AD 52. It was the headquarters of the church from the first century. Muziris is possibly around the ancient town of Kodungallur (Cranganore) near Cochin. In course of time, this word changed to Malankara. In history, there is importance for Jerusalem because Christian church was begun from there, likewise Christianity in Kerala began from Maliankara by St. Thomas. Knowingly or unknowingly all Orthodox churches re-fix this name with their churches to claim lineage of initial beginning of Christianity.

== History ==
The Pentecostal movement began during the first day of 1901 just as the world entered the twentieth century. The first person to be baptized in the Holy Spirit accompanied by speaking in tongues was Agnes Ozman, one of Parham's Bible school students. This made the Pentecostal movement of the twentieth century. This awakening spread rapidly to all parts of America. A three-year revival meeting under leadership of William J. Seymour started at Azusa street mission in Los Angeles from 1906 to 1909 that attracted believers from around the world. George E. Berg, an Independent American missionary of German descent, went to India in 1901 and returned to the United States in 1908, where he received the Spirit baptism at Azusa street mission in 1908. He came to India accompanied with Lang, Bird, Maynard, Musabai, Arthur and David and proclaimed the first Pentecostal message at Thrikkannamangal during December 1909. In subsequent years, 1910 and 1911, he came with native missionary Cummins, an Anglo Indian and delivered the same message at Thrikkannamangal. Berg went to America in 1912 for world Pentecostal conference and met Missionary Robert F. Cook and both of them came to Bangalore during 1913, extending the Gospel work to South India. Robert F. Cook shifted his headquarters from Bangalore to Thrikkannamangal in 1921. The name given to the Church which he established at Thrikkannamangal was "Malankara Poorna Suvisesha Sabha". This name was changed to Malankara Church of God, Thrikkannamangal during 1984.

=== St Thomas Churches in Kerala ===
St. Thomas, the apostle of Jesus Christ is believed to have landed in AD 52, in Cranganore near Cochin.

F. E Keay in his book recorded that even before Christ there were trade connections with Middle East and Palestine in spices and luxury articles like ivory. Thomas preached Gospel to Jew community and Hindus. He brought many Jews and Hindu families to the faith. He established seven Churches: Cranganore (Malankara), Chawghaat (Palayoor), Paravur near Alwye, Gokamanglam, Niranam, Nilakal (Chayal), Quilon (Kalyan), and Thiruvancode. In four of these places churches still exist.

He is said to have ordained presbyters for the churches from four Brahmin families called Sankarapuri, Pakolomattam, Kalli, and Kalliankal. After this he went to Malacca and to China, and finally returned to Mylapure in Madras city where his preaching aroused the hostility of Brahmins. He was speared to death about the year AD 72.

Mention is made in the records of the council of Nicea (AD325) of the presence of a Bishop John from India. The history of the ancient church during 4th to 15th century reveals the fact that it was in friendly relation with the church in Persia. There is a tradition that a group of 400 immigrants from Persia arrived in Malabar in AD 345 under the leadership of a merchant named Kanaye Thommen. There is immigration from Persia in the year AD 825 under the leadership of a Persian merchant named Marwan Sabriso with two Bishops named Mar Sapro and Mar Prodh. They landed in Quilon. King Cheraman Perumal gave them land and extended to them special privileges, inscribed on two sets of copper plates (in Malayalam chepped) the early periods it would appear that considerable believers were Syrians and Persian by race. They intermingled with the people of the country and became indianite.

There was ecclesiastical connection between the church in west Asia and church in Malabar till 16th century. The Bishops who came from a Babylonian patriarchate were Nestorians. Even now there is a Nestorian church in Trichur, called the Chaldean Syrian Church. They have connection with the Nestorian Patriarch. Though there were such ecclesiastical connections and ministrations, the church in Malabar was Independent in administration under its own Archdeacons. Portuguese started their entry in India with arrival of Vasco da Gama in AD 1498; they began to take control of the churches. For more than fifty years Malankara church was under the yoke of Rome.

In AD 1653, after 54 years of subordination to Roman control, the church freed with the oath of Coonan cross and gained the loyalty to their ancient faith and traditions. Their dream was finally succeeded when their Archdeacon, Thomas by name was duly consecrated with title "Mar Thoma" in 1665 by Mar Gregorius of Jerusalem who was associated with the Jacobite Patriarchate of Antioch. He was the first Indian Metropolitan. The connection with the Antioch Jacobites restored, because of the relationship with Syrian church. The church in Malankara was also known as Syrian church of Malankara.

After the arrival of missionaries from Church Mission Society of London the Malankara Syrian Church had relation with them. Soon difference of opinion arises in doctrine and the relationship came down with the result of parting. With the new converts they gained and the Syrians who joined with them eventually formed a branch of the church of England known as the Dioceses of Travancore and Cochin in 1879. But further reformation took place under the leadership of Palakunnathu Abraham Malpan of Maramon (1796–1845) and Kaithayil Geevarghese Malpan of Puthupally (1800–1855), since some people in the church longed for the removal of non-scriptural customs and practices which had crept into the church over the centuries. There was litigation between reformed group and original group for many years for the possession of individual churches. The reformed group got only Maramon and Kozhenchery churches by court verdict and Kottrakara church without contest. Five churches given to both parties to use on alternate Sundays. Reformed group put up small sheds in other places for worship. Though the reformed group lost their property; they influenced the people for spiritual revival and enjoyed great joy in the new situation. In 1864, Mathew Mar Athanasius Metropolitan allowed Ammal, the daughter of a famous Tamil convert, Vedanayak Sastri, to visit the churches and inspire the people through the Christian songs.

=== Translation of Bible into Malayalam Language ===
Till eighteenth century, there was no Malayalam translation of Bible available. Only Syrian and Latin language Bible were available. William Carey translated Bible into four North Indian languages, after his arrival in India in 1793. According to his ambition to translate Bible into more Indian languages, Claudius Buchanan vice principal of Calcutta College and Anglican Church Bishop Benjamin Bailey reached Kerala during 1806. In 1807, he translated four Gospels into Malayalam. One Tamil pandit by the name Thimappa pillai and Manangnaziyathu Philiphose Rabban helped him. It was printed in kuriyar press Bombay. In 1917 Benjamin Bialy started to translate full Bible into Malayalam. For his help Moses, Vaidhyanatha Iyer and Chanthu Menon joined with him. It happened that Chanthu Menon belongs to Ottapalam and his two sons Padmanaba Menon and Govindan kutty Menon received baptism before the completion of translation. They received the name Joseph Fen, Bailey Fen and Baker Fen respectively. In 1824, Bailey printed the "Gospel of Mathew" in CMS press Kottayam. In 1829, New Testament was printed. In 1835, Old Testament was printed. Full Bible was printed in 1841. The Full Bible which we use now was printed in 1910.

=== Spiritual revival in South India ===
Anthony Norris Groves, professionally a dentist and one of the founder leaders of Plymouth Brethren movement in England arrived in India in 1836 and established a missionary team in Madras, his activities centered in Bihar, Godavari area of Andhra Pradesh and Tamil Nadu. He returned to England in 1852 and fell asleep in Jesus, at 12 on Friday 20 May 1853. His missionary career influenced his Indian disciple John Arulappan, who created an expanding network of indigenous Christian fellowships in the Madurai district, Tamil Nadu. Great revival with outpouring of Holy Spirit took place in Christianpettah in Tirunelveli District in 1860. Mathai, a CMS Evangelist from Tirunelveli who was a disciple of Arulappan, came to Travancore which caused an out pouring of the Spirit in Travancore in 1874–75. In both cases, charismatic gifts (prophesy, glossolalia, glossographia and interpretation of tongues) prayer for the sick, falling down and shaking, as well as restoration of the offices of Apostle and prophet were present. Justus Joseph also known as Vidhuvankutty Achen, was a Brahmin convert and a scholar. On 26 Nov 1865, he was ordained as a deacon in the CMS Church. He was attracted by the revival message and began to conduct revival meetings around Mavelikara.

During the middle of the nineteenth century many of Hindu customs and superstitions prevailed in Christian religious life which consisted of certain ceremonies, rituals and festival offerings were made to saints to avoid calamities and to gain personal affairs. Special festivals were held on the feasts of certain saints and the image of saints was taken in procession to please them and to gain their favor.

Vidhuvankutty Achen found all these superstitions and rituals are against the Bible and conducted revival meetings in and around of Mavelikara, kannettil and all places of Travancore. His talent of singing and revival meetings attracted many people irrespective of denominations and religion. In his meetings many people committed their life for Christ. Everywhere, there arose a revival and people began to sing and dance and rejoice in the Lord. A great revival took place in Syrian Churches. Though we could not agree with his teachings, due to his revival meeting, great awakenings among the Christians happened and many began to read Bible to understand real truth. In 1873, 1119 copies of Bible were sold in Kerala, but in 1874 the number increased to 3034. With this growth of readership of the scripture, the moral standard of Christians grew and they turned away from alcoholism, witchcraft, magic and stealing. People began to spend more time in reading Bible, praying, fasting and many lives were transformed. According to most Rev. Dr. Juhanon Mar Thomas, Vidhuvankutty Achen (Justus Joseph) had a vital role in the Revival movement of the Marthoma Church. The spiritual revival started by a preacher Mathai Upadesi and carried on by Rev. Justus Joseph a famous scholar and musician and a Brahmin convert had its influence throughout the central Travancore. He wrote many Malayalam revival songs. 'Sthuthipin Sthuthipin Yeshu Devane' was written by him, this song is sung every year to conclude the final meeting of the Maramon convention by the congregation. This practice started in 1895 and still continues. He founded the Church called "Youyomaya Sabha". This group made controversial predictions and not flourished progressively.

In December 1894, a well known preacher from Tamil Nadu, known as Tamil David and Wordsworth took over the leadership of the revivalism, visited Kerala preached about salvation at Puthencavu. During this meeting, a young boy aged eleven year named K. V. Simon accepted Jesus as savior. Maramon Convention was started in 1895. Later the spirit of revivalism was continued by the blessed leaders like CMS missionary Rev. Thomas Walker from Tirunelveli in Tamil Nadu, Punchamannil Mammen Upadeshi and Muthampackal Kochukunju upadesi. In 1896, J. Gilson, the famous Keswick Convention speaker, a Baptist missionary came to Kerala in the Maramon convention. Many accepted Jesus as their savior and many priests and laymen took baptism. Due to this, he was barred by the church leaders. In the year 1897, P.E Mammen(Kumbanattachen) Vicar received baptism from a Brethren missionary Handily Bird. In 1899, P.C Mammen was baptized. Separate worship was conducted in the residence of Kuttyil Mathai. This meeting was interrupted, due to opposition. Regular worship meeting was started at Kavaungprayar on 3 September 1899. In 1906, V. Nagal started his ministry in Nellikunnu, Trichur. On 25 December 1915, K.V Simon was expelled from Marthoma Church due to preaching of baptism. This was the significant turning point in the Brethren movement in Kerala. On 20 January 1929, K.V. Simon joined with the movement of Mr. Noel and P.E. Mammen resulting united movement and paved the foundation of Brethren assemblies in Kerala.

=== Spiritual revival in North India ===
As a consequence of renewed European missionary fervor (beginning in 1897) and enriched by the Welsh Revival (1904), a series of revivals swept across in India in 1905–1906. This awakening encompassed mostly Protestant groups, including Anglican(CMS) Baptist, Danish Lutheran mission society, Church of Scotland, Methodists, Brethren and all reformed churches involving confession of sin and prayer storms, hours spent in fervent and loud prayer, followed with Pentecostal-like phenomena including prophecies, dreams, visions and accounts of visible "tongues of fire". This revival was more dynamic at Pandita Remabai's "Mukti mission" at Kedgaon in Maharashtra state. One of the greatest out pouring of the Holy Spirit in modern times happened in her orphanage of child and widows. But none of these denominational revivals come out of their four walls and had separate Pentecostal churches anywhere in India.

=== Beginning of Pentecostal Movement ===
George E. Berg, an independent American missionary of German descent, went to India in 1901, and returned to the United States in 1908, where he received the Spirit of baptism at Azusa street mission in 1908. He returned to India and lived in Bangalore, having it as a center for work. In 1909, he came to Thrikkannamangal accompanied with Brethren missionaries, Land, Bird Maynard, Musabai, Arthur and David. During this convention, Berg spoke about the baptism of Holy Spirit, he received at Azusa Street, but Brethren missionaries opposed it. In 1910, accompanied with Brethren missionaries Noel, David, Grander and Arthur, he came for the convention from 13 to 20 December, and spoke about the baptism of Holy Spirit. Due to strong protest of Brethren missionaries, in 1911, he came along with a native missionary Cummins, an Anglo Indian and conducted convention. In this convention, the main theme was about the baptism of Holy Spirit. Many people accepted the revival message and was baptized with Holy Spirit. During these visits, he visited the place Thuvayur and conducted meetings there, at Brethren church, many Brethren people were anointed with Holy Spirit and received doctrine of Pentecost. Berg went to America during the year 1912 to participate in the world Pentecostal conference conducted in Los Angeles. Robert F. Cook also participated in the conference and he was attracted by the message delivered by Berg in the conference, and took decision to go to India. Next year, in 1913, Berg and Cook reached Bangalore and by the end of December, they started their missionary work; by travelling in train, staying some days at Tirunelveli and by train they reached Kottarakkara and went to Thuvayur in Travancore. Many people were baptized and joined the Church. In 1914, Berg and Cook again visited Kottarakkara and conducted meeting at Thuvayur and many people were baptized. Since the World War I started in 1914, Berg was compelled to return to USA, as he was a German descent.

=== Beginning of Malankara Pentecostal Church of God ===
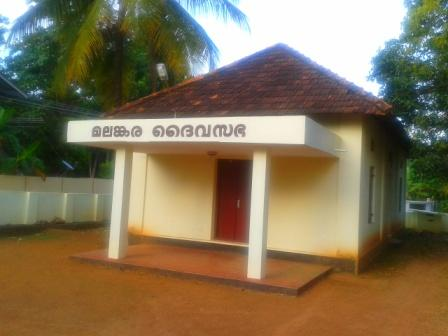
Malankara Church of God, Kottarakkara old building- estd.1928

Missionary Cook stayed at Bangalore during the 1st World war time and started his work again in 1917 at Tamil Nadu and Kerala. As a result of his work many people converted and received baptism. He established Churches at Adoor, Vilakudy and Chaliakara estate at Punalur. While working among estate workers of Chaliakara and Ambanad, he had acquaintance with managers of the estate, who were Europeans. By this time he wanted to shift his headquarters from Bangalore to somewhere near Kottarakara. Through the estate managers he came to know one contractor sri Geevargese Koshy, Vadakadathu veedu from Thrikkannamangal and he agreed to give his house for his stay. In 1921, he shifted his headquarters from Bangalore to Villakonathu Bunglow at Thrikkannamangal, Kottarakkara. He made a temporary shed in the compound and started worship, great revival took place. Many people converted and received baptism. Many sick people healed and baptized with Holy Spirit. He named the Church as Malankara Poorna Suvisesha Sabha.

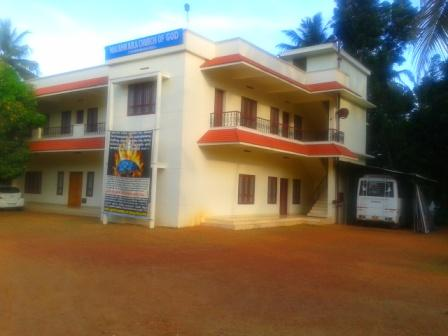
Malankara Church of God, Kottarakkara new building- estd.2011

The work progressed, many churches were planted. Many Hindu people received Jesus Christ as their savior and took baptism. Among these, one Hindu blacksmith received baptism known as Paulose, from Thrikkannamangal. At his residence he started a Bible study class and later it was shifted to Mulakuzha in 1926 and now it is known as Mount Zion Bible Seminary. In 1928, seven families joined and purchased four cents of land nearby and constructed a hall for worship and the worship of Cook from the temporary shed was shifted to this hall. This is one of the first Pentecostal Church in Kerala, established by Cook. The Pastors of the church in different period were Cook, Charles Cummins, K.C. Chandy, A.R.T. Athisayam and M.K.Varghese. This has been continued till 1942 and division took place, one group remained at Malankara church and another group under the leadership of Cook bought land at the present place and constructed prayer hall, where full Gospel Church of God is functioning at present. In 1936 Cook joined with full Gospel Church of God Cleveland in America. Many of his co-workers parted with him and formed their own movements like Indian Pentecostal Church and The Pentecostal Mission.
