= Pentecostalism in Kerala =

Renewal movement in the Indian state

Pentecostalism in Kerala is a Christian renewal movement in the Indian state of Kerala. It developed during the early twentieth century in the context of existing Christian traditions, Protestant missionary activity and indigenous religious reform movements. Kerala Pentecostalism has been influenced by both local developments and international Pentecostal networks.

== History ==
=== Early development ===
Pentecostalism emerged in Kerala during the early twentieth century. Its development was connected to earlier Christian revival and reform movements, including movements that emphasised Bible study, personal conversion, holiness and changes in church organisation. These developments took place within Kerala's diverse Christian landscape and were influenced by debates concerning caste, gender and religious authority.

American missionaries George Berg and Robert F. Cook were associated with the early spread of Pentecostal teachings in South India. Their activities contributed to the interaction between local Christian communities and the wider international Pentecostal movement. Indigenous Christian leaders also played an important role in establishing Pentecostal congregations and organisations in Kerala.

The Pentecostal message from the West arrived in Kerala in 1909 through the visit of George Berg. This American missionary of German descent arrived in Bangalore in 1909 and preached in a convention in Kerala. The first Pentecostal congregation was formed through the efforts of Berg in Kerala only in 1911; this was among first generation Christians. Berg was the first missionary to reach out to the natives who did not speak English.

In 1913 Pastor Robert F. Cook also came to India as a missionary. He came to Kerala and began his ministry there in 1914. By 1923, Cook had established 36 churches in Kerala, known collectively as the South India Church of God (Full Gospel) in India. Pastor K. E. Abraham, who was associated with Pastor Cook until 1930, was baptized in the Holy Spirit in 1923, an event considered as the foundation for the establishment of the India Pentecostal Church of God. In 1930, Pastor K.E Abraham who believed that local Keralite churches must be independent from foreign organizations for effective evangelization within India, split from Pastor Cook and formed the South India Pentecostal Church of God. He later changed the name of the church to India Pentecostal Church of God.

In addition to the work begun by Abraham, Pentecostalism grew rapidly in Kerala through the ministries of the Ceylon Pentecostal Mission (CPM), the Church of God (Cleveland), and the Assemblies of God.

=== Indigenous movements and denominations ===
The growth of Pentecostalism in Kerala was not simply an extension of missionary activity from abroad. Local preachers, congregations and Christian reformers helped shape its development. Research on the movement has examined how Pentecostal communities responded to existing church traditions and to the social conditions of the period, including caste-based inequalities and restrictions on women's participation.

The Indian Pentecostal Church of God and the Assemblies of God are among the organisations associated with the wider Pentecostal tradition in India. Kerala also developed independent congregations and fellowships with their own leadership structures and approaches to worship and evangelism.

== New-generation churches ==
The term new-generation churches has been used in academic research to describe certain independent Christian congregations that emerged in Kerala and among Malayali communities overseas. Scholar Stanley John has examined their historical development, religious practices and relationship with earlier Christian traditions. The classification of these churches as neo-Pentecostal has also been discussed in scholarship.

== Notable communities ==
- Indian Pentecostal Church of God (IPC)
- Assemblies of God in India (AG)
- Church of God (Full Gospel) in India (COG)
- The Pentecostal Mission (TPM)
- Glorious Church Of God (Malayam Daiva Sabha)
- Sharon Fellowship Church (SFC)
- New India Church of God (NICOG)
- New India Bible Church (NIBC)
- World Mission Evangelism Church of God (WME)
- Agape Full Gospel Mission
- The Apostolic Ministries International (TAMI)
- Suvartha Center Church (SCC)
- Malankara Christian Church (MCC)
- Church Of God Full Gospel In India Kerala Region
- Karisma Fire Ministries
- Nazarene Followers Church (NFC)
- Church of God Prayer Tower India(CGPTI)
- Ephphatha Ministries, Mumbai
- The Church of God (Kallumala)

== Population ==
Denominations among all Christians in Kerala
1. Syro-Malabar 38.2 (37.5%)
2. Syro-Malankara 7.6 (7.47%)
3. Latin Catholics 15.2 (14.9%)
4. Pentecost 5.3 (5.21%)
5. Orthodox 8 (7.86%)
6. Marthoma 6.6 (6.48%)
7. CSI 4.5 (4.42%)
8. Dalit Christian 2.6 (2.55%)
9. Jacobite 7.9 (7.76%)
10. Others 5.9 (5.80%)

=== Christian denominations in Kerala, 2011 ===
Communities	Population	Percentage
Syro-Malabar	2345911	7.0%
Latin catholics	932733	2.8%
Orthodox	493858	1.5%
Jacobite	482762	1.4%
Marthoma	405089	1.2%
Other Christians	361864	1.1%
CSI	274255	0.8%
Pentecost	213806	0.6%
Dalits	159982	0.5%
Total Christians	6141269	18.4%

Source: Religious Denominations of Kerala

== Youth associations ==
Youth Association Name	Community
PYPA (Pentecostal Young People's Association)	India Pentecostal Church of God
YPE (Young People's Endeavour)	Church of God
CA (Christ Ambassadors)	Assemblies of God
Royal Youth	Glorious Church Of God
CEM (Christian Evangelical Movement)	Sharon Fellowship Church
NLYF (New Life Youth Fellowship)	New India Bible Church
YPCA (Young People's Christian Association)	New India Church of God
YF (Youth Fellowship)	World Mission Evangelism Church of God
PYF (Pentecost Youth Fellowship)	Pentecost Church of God
Youth Impact	New Life Assembly of God Worship Center, Kadapra, Kumbanad.
FTC 1	FOR THE CRUCIFIED ONE

== Lifestyle ==
In classical Pentecostalism, the baptism with the Holy Spirit is understood to be a separate and distinct experience occurring sometime after regeneration. Influenced by the Holiness movement, baptism with the Holy Spirit was regarded by the first Pentecostals as being the third work of grace, following the new birth (first work of grace) and entire sanctification (second work of grace).

John Wesley, the founder of the Methodist movement, taught that there were two distinct phases in the Christian experience. In the first work of grace, the new birth, the believer received forgiveness and became a Christian. During the second work of grace, sanctification, the believer was purified and made holy. Wesley taught both that sanctification could be an instantaneous experience, and that it could be a gradual process.

Early Methodists wore plain dress, with Methodist clergy condemning "high headdresses, ruffles, laces, gold, and 'costly apparel' in general". John Wesley recommended that Methodists annually read his thoughts On Dress; in that sermon, John Wesley expressed his desire for Methodists: "Let me see, before I die, a Methodist congregation, full as plain dressed as a Quaker congregation". The 1858 Discipline of the Wesleyan Methodist Connection thus stated that "we would ... ejoin on all who fear God plain dress".

Outward Holiness, or External Holiness, is a Wesleyan-Arminian doctrine emphasizing modest dress and sober speech. The doctrine was prevalent during the revival movements for the early Lutheran Pietists and Methodists, and during the Holiness and Pentecostal movements. Some Christian denominations within the Wesleyan-Arminian theological tradition, such as some Methodist, Holiness, and Pentecostal denominations continue to observe outward holiness. The standards are:

- Modest and plain dress, which is defined as loose covering from the neck to below the knee in all normal body postures; women often wear a Christian headcovering. This would also include the strict prohibition of mixed bathing.
- Moderate or no use of jewelry or ornaments of gold, silver, and jewels for personal adornment; some denominations will only allow the use of a wedding band or ring while others proscribe it too.
- A distinction of the sexes in clothing, forbidding such style as trousers and pant suits for women unless required by work or public service.
- Christian men are to wear their hair short and Christian women must never cut or remove their hair, wearing it long in order to have a definitive distinction of male and female sexes.

As a continuation, in Kerala many Traditional Pentecostal denominations do not wear ornaments depending upon the denomination they are part of. However Dr. Valsan Abraham who is the current president of IPC Church has mentioned that removing ornaments is not a part of Biblical doctrine but the forefathers of IPC CHURCH had decided to have a simple lifestyle and the practice of removing ornaments has never ever recorded in the constitution of IPC and in the statement of faith. Most of the Independent churches in Kerala do not have a practice of removing ornaments. At the turn of the century, more and more traditional churches are moving away from the practice of mandating compulsory removal of ornaments and classifying it as a personal choice of believers.

== Institutions ==
List of some main institutions are:

- New India Bible seminary, Paippad
- India Bible College & Seminary, Kumbanad
- MT Zion Bible Seminary, Mulakuzha
- Faith Theological Seminary, Manakkala
- Bethel Bible College, Punalur
- Sharon Bible College, Thiruvalla
- Shalom Bible College, Vadavathoor
- IPC Kottayam Theological Seminary, Puthuppally
- Rhema Bible Seminary, Nallur, Palakkad. Accredited by ATA
- New India Bible Institute, Kozhikode
- Calicut Theological College - Kozhikode
- Asian Bible College - Kochi
- Trinity Bible College Kozhikode, Waynad
- Hebron Bible College (PG), Hebronpuram, Kumbanad

== Media ==
Media plays a leading role to spread Pentecostalism in Kerala through Television Channels, Radio Channels, Newspapers/Magazines and Social Media.

Television Channels	Radio/FM Channels	Newspapers/Magazines	Presence in Social Media
Powervision TV	Bafa Radio	Good News	Online Good News
Harvest TV	Psalms Radio	Hallelujah	Dunatos Gospel Ministries
Trumpet TV	Radio Manna	Believers Journal	M4manna
Kahalam TV	Jesus Coming FM	Marupacha	Pentecostal Vibes
Manna TV	RAFA Radio	Kraisthava Ezhuthupura	
Glorious TV	My Appa	Glorious Time	
IAG TV	My Worship Radio	Disciples News	

== Resistance ==
The US-based persecution watchdog International Christian Concern (ICC) has learned some attacks on Christians in Kerala, generally considered a safe-haven for Christians because of the large Christian minority there. The ICC warned that the Kerala attacks would only embolden anti-Christian extremists elsewhere to attack the even more vulnerable Christians in their states.

The Vishwa Hindu Parishad along with the Arya Samaj arranged the Ghar Wapsi Program and converted a few number of Christians to Hinduism in Kerala. Because Dalit Christians had belonged to SC/ST communities before conversion to Christianity, but they are denied the government's SC/ST benefits in education and job reservation. The Supreme Court ruled that a person who reconverts from Christianity to Hinduism shall be entitled to reservation benefits if his forefathers belonged to a Scheduled Caste and the community accepts him after reconversion.

== International evangelists in Kerala ==
- Billy Graham

American Evangelist Billy Graham came in February 1956, conducted program in Kottayam in Kerala. Most of the pentecostal Christian homes in Kerala had the wall poster with the side view picture of 36 years old Evangelist Dr. Billy Graham with the writing "God is Calling The Church”.

- Reinhard Bonnke

German Evangelist Reinhard Bonnke preached in Kochi for the CfaN Fire Conference on April 9-13, 2008.

== See also ==
- Christianity
- Christianity in Kerala
- Assemblies of God in India
- India Pentecostal Church of God
- Church of God (Full Gospel) in India
- Methodism
- History of Pentecostalism in India
- Pentecost
- The Pentecostal Mission
