= Pentecostal Mission =

Pentecostal Mission may refer to:

- Pentecostal Mission, an American 19th century holiness denomination that merged into the Church of the Nazarene in 1915
- The Pentecostal Mission, a Pentecostal denomination that originated in Sri Lanka in 1923
