= Bethel Assembly of God Church =

Church in Bangalore City, India

- 13°02′31″N 77°35′42″E
- Location: Bethel AG Church, Ring Road, Hebbal, Bangalore, Karnataka, India, 560024
- Country: India
- Denomination: Pentecostal
- Website: bethelagindia.org

History
- Founded: 1960

Clergy
- Pastor(s): Rev. Abraham Varghese, Rev. Johnson V

Bethel Assemblies of God Church is the fastest growing Pentecostal megachurch located in Bangalore City, Karnataka, India. It is affiliated with the General Council of the Assemblies of God of India. It is one of the largest churches in India. According to the church, over 60,000 members attend its services each week and the church also has over 100 affiliated outstations under its coverage. Bethel Assembly of God Church was founded in 1960. M. A. Varughese was appointed in 1983 as the pastor-in-charge and he currently serves as the Senior Pastor of the church.

== Linguistic Services ==
Services are conducted in the following languages:

1. Malayalam
2. English
3. Kannada
4. Tamil
5. Hindi
6. Telugu
7. French

== Other Services ==
Bethel Assembly of God Church launched a drive-in worship service where the congregation can attend the service from cars to maintain physical distancing during the COVID-19 pandemic. Multiple LED screens and sound systems were installed in the three acre open ground adjacent to the church to facilitate the Sunday worship service.

== Green Initiative ==
Bethel Assembly of God Church pledged to plant 1000 tree saplings in Bangalore city on the occasion of their senior Pastor Rev. Dr. MA Varughese's birthday.
