= Mulakuzha =

- Village
- Location in Kerala, India Mulakuzha (India)
- Coordinates: 9°17′50″N 76°39′0″E
- Country: India
- State: Kerala
- Region: South India
- District: Alappuzha

Population (2011)
  - Total: 283,906

Languages
  - Official: English, Malayalam, Hindi
- Time zone: UTC+5:30 (IST)
- PIN: 689505
- Landline code: 0479
- Vehicle registration: KL-30 & KL-4
- Nearest city: Chengannur
- Lok Sabha constituency: Mavelikkara
- Vidhan Sabha constituency: Chengannur
- Website: lsgkerala.in/mulakuzhapanchayat/

Mulakuzha or മുളക്കുഴ is a village in Alappuzha district in the state of Kerala, India. Mulakuzha is located in Chengannur tehsil, and residents are mostly artisans and farmers.

== Etymology ==
The word of mouth knowledge about the etymological roots of the name is that at first the name was "Mullakara" which translates in Malayalam as "Land of Bamboos" which was later altered to Mulakuzha (Mula + kuzha/kula=Bamboo+Area).

== Location and climate ==
This village is situated around 6 km from Chengannur taluk, and shares a border with Pathanamthitta district. A salubrious balneologic canal runs through the heart of this village from the Pamba River, venerated as the "Southern Ganges".

Mulakuzha has a tropical climate. As per Köppen climate classification it has a tropical monsoon climate (Am). Precipitation is the lowest in January, with an average of 20 mm. In June due to the South-west monsoon, the precipitation reaches its peak, with an average of 556 mm (Edavappathy). A brief spell of pre-monsoon "mango showers" hits the village sometime during March. April is the warmest month of the year and due to environmental changes such as loss of tree cover, summer begins with spikes of warm humid weather. The temperature in April averages 29.1 °C. In July, the average temperature is 26.5 °C. December is the coolest month of the year. The average temperatures vary during the year by 2.6 °C. The retreating monsoon with afternoon precipitation accompanied by thunder and lightning starts from mid-October (Thulavarsham). Monsoon seasons (Karkidakam) between June and August are considered apt for ayurvedic cleansing and rejuvenation therapies. From September to March the climate is pleasant and comfortable.

== Facilities ==
The community is provided with a range of basic amenities. The farmer's market is open on Mondays and Thursdays. Some of the major landmarks in this village are the Century Hospital, state schools VHSS and LPS (1909), Sri Dharma Shasta Temple, Nediyathu Devi Temple, Gandharva Muttam Bhagavati Temple, Parayirukala Devi Temple, Pallippadi Juma Masjid, St. Thomas Marthoma Syrian Church – Kerala headquarters of the Church of God – and St. Mary's Orthodox Church.GVHSS School is one of the prominent schools in the village.

== Demographics ==
As of 2011 India census, Mulakuzha village had a population of 28,390 with 13,091 males and 15,299 females. Different religions are represented, with Hindus, Christians, and Muslims among the inhabitants.
