= P. J. Thomas (pastor) =

Indian pastor

Rev. P. J. Thomas (Painnumoottil John Thomas)
- Born: April 15, 1914
- Died: July 24, 1999
- Education: Master's degree in Comparative Religion

Ecclesiastical career
- Church: Indian Pentecostal Church & Sharon Fellowship Church

Painnumoottil John Thomas (April 15, 1914 – March 24, 1998) was an Indian pastor.

Thomas's father was P. V. John (Ayyapilla Sir) encountered Christianity through a native missionary (Kappiar Upadesi) who taught him John 3:16. This resulted in leaving his Hindu Brahmin background. He married Sossamma and they had five boys(John, Daniel, Thomas, Jacob, George) and one girl(Leelaamma). P J Thomas is the third oldest among the siblings. Thomas attended Serampore University and earned a Diploma in Theology. He became the principal of the IPC free School. Following his marriage to Aleyamma from Keezhvaipur, Mallappally, he left for Australia for higher studies. He went to England from Australia and to the U.S., where he attended Wheaton College (Illinois) and got a Master's degree in Comparative Religion. He taught at Wheaton for a short time before returning to India in 1952. Before he went back to India, he was instrumental in bringing the then three senior Indian Pentecostal Church pastors, K.E. Abraham, K.C. Cherian, and P.M. Samuel to the U.S. He also traveled with Abraham and interpreted for him across the U.S.

Following his return to India, the late J. Varghese (Kochusir) persuaded him to settle down at Tiruvalla. He purchased the present Sharon property in March 1953 and made it their home. The fame of "Sharon" came with two revival meetings and the opening of the Bible College at Sharon compound. On Nov. 30, 1953 missionaries arrived who conducted 30 days of revival and healing ministry, the last week's attendance was over 100,000 a night. These meeting were conducted without any foreign donation, only from the free will offering of the people who attended. Hundreds turned to the Lord and were baptized. Many were healed of their illnesses. Rev. John E.Douglas and Rev R. W. Schambach who were instrumental for this meetings. With the completion of the Sharon Hall, Sharon Bible College was born in 1955 where several pastors have been trained.

The 1950s were a period of unrest within the Indian Pentecostal Church. During the split in the Church the Sharon Hall was often used as a place of mediation, but Thomas remained neutral. Several independent churches approached him to help them with building churches and buying burial grounds and to give them a hand in common fellowship. As a result he decided to remain independent. Although it had a small beginning the church began to grow beginning the mid sixties, he called it a fellowship of churches thus it is called Sharon Fellowship Churches of India, but commonly called as Sharon Fellowship Church.
