= Thrikkannamangal =

- town
- Location in Kerala, India Thrikkannamangal (India)
- Coordinates: 8.9885°N 76.7762°E
- Country: India
- State: Kerala
- District: Kollam

Languages
  - Official: Malayalam, English
- Time zone: UTC+5:30 (IST)
- Nearest city: Kottarakara
- Lok Sabha constituency: Mavelikkara

Thrikkannamangal is a village located in the tehsil of Kottarakara in the Kollam district of Kerala, India.

== Etymology ==
The town derives its name from the direction in which the kings of old, standing in their palace, would face in the morning. Kottarakara, a city in Kerala, is so named because it once housed the kings' "kottaram," or palace. The town is home to people of diverse faiths and political views.

== Demographics ==
The town has a significant presence of both Hindus and Christians. While the Muslim population is notable, it is smaller compared to the Hindu and Christian communities. Political support in the area is largely divided between the Congress and Communist parties.

== Educational institutions ==
- S K V High School
- Govt LPGS
- CVNMLP ( Kalloor School)
- Panorama College
- Novel Tuition Centre
- Carmel Residential Senior Secondary School, Kadavila

== Attractions ==
Thrikkannamangal is home to a Kathakali museum located at Thottam Junction. Kathakali, a traditional dance form, originated in Kerala.
