= Church of God (Full Gospel) in India =

Pentecostal Christian denomination

Church Of God (Full Gospel) in India (COG)
- Cross with wave of the Holy Spirit
- Abbreviation: COG in India
- Classification: Protestant, Evangelicalism
- Orientation: Pentecostal
- Polity: Reformed Episcopal
- Region: India and Gulf Countries
- Headquarters: Mulakuzha, India
- Founder: Robert F. Cook
- Origin: Started in 1917

The Church of God (Full Gospel) in India is the registered name of the Church of God (Cleveland)‘s branch in India. Church of God (Cleveland) is a Pentecostal church that has over 36,000 churches and 7 million members in 178 countries.

On 19 August 1886, the Church of God began in Monroe County, Tennessee, near the North Carolina border.Eight persons formed a gathering, a Christian Union, guided by former Baptist Richard Green Spurling to follow New Testament as a rule of faith and practice.

In July 2012, a web presentation of 125 Years of Church of God Ministry, was done at the 74th International General Assembly in Orlando, Florida.

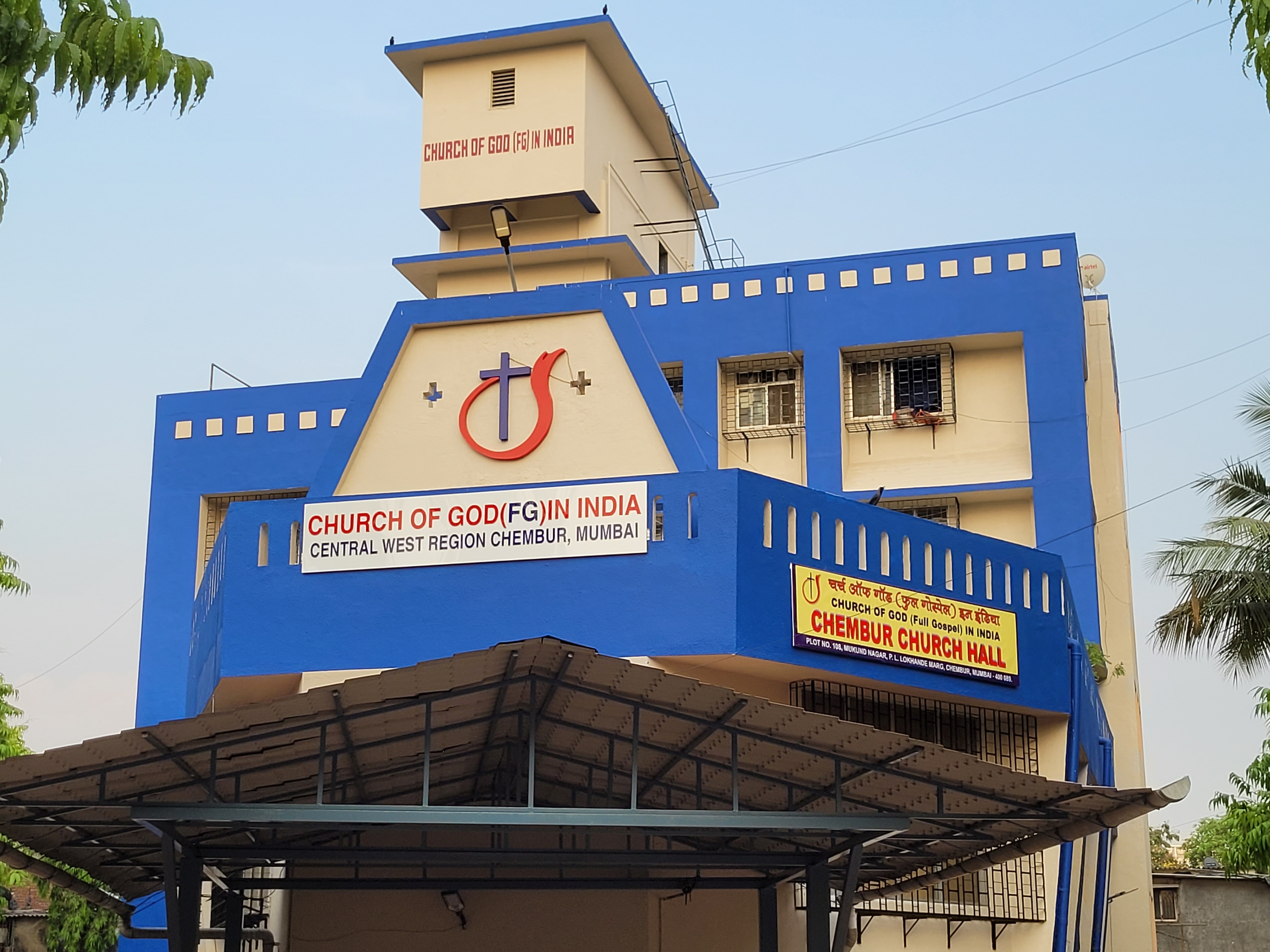
Central West Region headquarter building.

== See also ==
- Church of God (Cleveland, Tennessee)
- Pentecostalism
