= Robert F. Cook =

Robert F. Cook (1880–1958) was an American Christian missionary to India responsible for the establishment of the Pentecostal movement in India.

== Sources ==
- 37 Years of Glorious Service Robert F. Cook. Cleveland: Church of God Publishing, 1975.
