= General Council of the Assemblies of God of India =

Pentecostal Christian denomination in India

- Classification: Evangelical Christianity
- Theology: Pentecostal
- Superintendent: Rev. Abraham Thomas
- Associations: World Assemblies of God Fellowship
- Headquarters: Chennai, India
- Origin: 1995
- Congregations: 5,200
- Official website: assembliesofgod.in

The General Council of the Assemblies of God of India is a Pentecostal Christian denomination in India. It is affiliated with the World Assemblies of God Fellowship. The headquarters is in Chennai, Tamil Nadu.

== History ==
The General Council of the Assemblies of God of India has its origins in a mission of the Assemblies of God USA in Chennai in 1916. The council was founded in 1995. In 2016, it had 5,200 churches.

== See also ==
- Christianity in India
- History of Pentecostalism in India
