= The Pentecostal Mission =

Pentecostal denomination

- ദി പെന്തിക്കോസ്ത് മിഷൻ பெந்தெகொஸ்தே சபை පෙන්තකොස්ත සභාව
- Abbreviation: CPM / TPM
- Classification: Christianity
- Orientation: Protestant
- Scripture: Bible
- Theology: Arminianism
- Polity: Episcopal
- Governance: Centralized leadership
- Structure: Hierarchical
- Chief Pastor: Pas.Abraham Mathew (current)
- Deputy Chief Pastor: Pas. Abraham (Lalu)
- Associate/ Deputy Chief Pastor: Pas. G.J. Jeyam
- Founder: Paul Ramankutty
- International Headquarters: Irumbuliyur, Chennai, Tamil Nadu, India.
- Region: Worldwide
- Liturgy: Pentecostal
- Headquarters: Irumbuliyur, Chennai, India
- Origin: 1923; Sri Lanka
- Congregations: 3,000+
- Members: 100000
- Other names: Ceylon Pentecostal Mission (CPM), Universal Pentecostal Church, New Testament Church
- Publications: Voice of Pentecost

The Pentecostal Mission (TPM), also known as Ceylon Pentecostal Mission (CPM) in Sri Lanka, New Testament Church (NTC) in the United States, Grace New Covenant Pentecostal Church in Canada and Universal Pentecostal Church (UPC) in the United Kingdom, is a Pentecostal denomination established in 1923 in Colombo, British Ceylon (now Sri Lanka). Its global headquarters is located in Irumbuliyur, Chennai, Tamil Nadu, India. The organization operates churches in over 75 countries under various names and has more than 2,000 places of worship worldwide. Formerly called the Ceylon Pentecostal Mission (CPM), the denomination has grown to include millions of members.

== History ==
The church was founded by Paul Ramankutty, who was born to Hindu parents in Engandiyur, a village in present-day Thrissur district, Kerala, India.

While in Ceylon, at the age of 18, he became a Christian and was baptised as an Anglican; in 1923 he and Alvin DeAlvis founded the Ceylon Pentecostal Mission in Colombo. Later, he felt a strong call and began to preach and share the gospel. In 1923 he founded the church with the name Ceylon Pentecostal Mission.

Later, due to the Sri Lankan Civil War, all Indian assignments which were called CPM (Ceylon Pentecostal Mission) were changed to TPM (The Pentecostal Mission). The CPM headquarters is at Mattakkuliya in Colombo and the TPM headquarters at Chennai. The names are used interchangeably in many parts of the World.

== School ==
The congregation in Sri Lanka operates the C.P.M Faith School in Wattala in Colombo. There is also a school in Yonkers, New York and in Newark, New Jersey and one in Africa.

== Church leadership ==
The church is led by a Chief Pastor (currently Abraham Mathew). In addition, there is a Deputy Chief Pastor (currently Pas. S.Abraham.) (Lalu) and an Associate Deputy Chief Pastor (currently G. Jeyam).

In the United States, most of the church work was pioneered by the late Don M Spiers, who had previously worked closely with Oral Roberts. Gregg Wilson now oversees the work in USA, many other countries around the USA as well as certain countries in Africa and other places. He is assisted by the sister-in-charge, Lisa Billow.

Full-time ministers are expected to practice an ascetic lifestyle including celibacy, obedience to the elder pastors, and communal living (including disposal of private possessions) in faith homes. TPM churches are run by full-time ministers who are celibate and predominantly single. Married couples who enter full-time ministry must become celibate and may be sent to different locations by the TPM leadership if they so choose.

== Church names ==
In other parts of the world, the church is known by the following names various names including, but not limited to, The Pentecostal Mission, Ceylon Pentecostal Mission, New Testament Church and Universal Pentecostal Church.

== Doctrines and teachings ==
The doctrines of the church broadly align with trinitarian Pentecostalism.

== Magazine ministry ==
Magazines are produced in several languages. The English language magazine published in India is called The Voice of Pentecost. Pilgrim's Journal is published and printed in the USA. Other English language magazines are Pentecostal Messenger from Malaysia, The Youth Herald from Singapore, Power Divine from Sri Lanka, and Trumpet of the Lord from the UK.

Church Magazines are being published in more than forty Indian languages and other foreign languages. Malayalam magazine Pentecost is one of the oldest Pentecostal magazines from Kerala. A Hindi edition of Pentecost Ki Wani published from New Delhi, a Tamil edition named Pentecost in Peroli from Irumbuliyur (Chennai), Pentecost-Chi Vaani from Mumbai, "Kadavari varshapu dwani" from Hyderabad, and Pentecost Da Sneha from Dhariwal (Punjab) are also produced

== Current Leading Chief Pastors ==
- Pas Abraham Mathew (Chief Pastor) 2018–present
- Pas S Abraham(Lalu) (Deputy Chief Pastor) May 2026- Present
- Pas G. Jeyam (Associate Deputy Chief Pastor) 2014–present
