= Arthi (Balmiki) =

Religious practice of Balmiki sect

Arthi (Panjabi: ਆਰਥੀ ) is a Balmiki ritual, similar in form to the Hindu practice of arti, in which light from wicks soaked in ghee or camphor is offered to Bhagawan Valmiki. Arthi is a form of bhakti devotion.

== Etymology ==
The word also refers to the traditional devotional song that is sung during the ritual. Arthi is performed and sung to develop the highest love for God as incarnated in the person of Valmiki.

== Tradition ==
Arthi is generally performed daily, and usually at the end of a pooja, bhajan session, or after reading the Ramayana in the Ashram. It is performed during almost all Balmiki ceremonies and occasions. It involves the circulating of an Arthi plate in front of the moorti of Valmiki and is accompanied by the Balmiki Arthi song. The poojari circulates the plate to all those present. They cup their down-turned hands over the flame and then raise their palms to their forehead - the purificatory blessing, passed from Valmiki's image to the flame, has now been passed to the devotee.

The arthi plate is generally made of metal, usually silver, bronze or copper. On it must repose a lamp made of kneaded flour, mud or metal, filled with oil or ghee. A cotton wick is put into the oil and then lighted, or camphor is burnt instead. The plate also contains flowers, incense and akshata.

=== Translation ===
Translation of the Arthi song as follows:

Praise Valmiki, praise Lord Valmiki, praise Valmiki Lord of truth, Creator and Provider of the universe (Chorus) Praise Valmiki------- (Chorus) Lord of infinite wisdom, Creator of all worlds, architect of all things. Praise Valmiki------- (Chorus) Lord Valmiki, you are the beginning, you are eternity, Oh Lord my provider you are perfection. Praise Valmiki------- (Chorus) Oh merciful Lord, you are the lealer of all ills. Rama preys to you always. Praise Valmiki------- (Chorus) Oh Lord you wrote yoga Vasistha and the Ram Charitar (Ramayana) by your holy hands for the world to listen and rid of all its troubles. Praise Valmiki------- (Chorus) Lord those who sings your praise and hymns daily, you will give them all their hearts desire. Praise Valmiki------- (Chorus)
