= Ashram (Balmiki) =

Main site of worship in the Balmiki faith

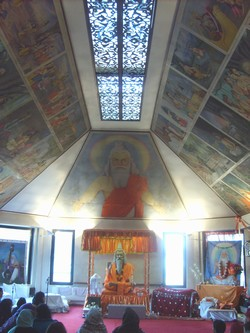
A Balmiki Ashram

A Balmiki temple is called an Ashram, which means a hermitage or monastery. It is the communal house for Balmikis. The function of the Ashram is to serve as a center for building up devotees' commitment and for transmitting the Ramayana's message, and the focal point for the whole community to preserve their culture and traditions.

For Balmikis communal prayer is not restricted to the confines of the Ashram, but can take place anywhere as long as the Ramayana is present. However, when an Ashram is not within traveling distance, many Balmiki families will have a special room in their house containing a copy of the Ramayana which can be used for worship.

When an Ashram is not available, Balmikis will hire a public building or use a private home as an Ashram.

== Features ==
All Balmiki Ashrams have a number of common features. For instance, the place of worship is always in a special room, and there are a number of other rooms set aside for special purposes. There is a Langar hall where all the devotees congregate for a meal, the community kitchen where devotees help to prepare food for the Langer, a classroom and library where the Ramayana is stocked for study and is used for teaching young children.

All Balmiki Ashrams display a special flag outside, called a Nishan Sahib, to indicated that it is a place of worship. The bow and arrows represent Valmiki’s disciples Lav and Kush.

There is a music room where musical instruments such as the Tabla are taught and hymns are practiced for worship. Finally, there is a special area for shoes and washing.

== Worship services ==
The Ashram is open to all who wish to enter, anyone who goes to the Ashram is welcome to stay as long as they wish and are welcome regardless of race, gender, caste or creed.

All Balmikis follow certain rules of conduct and before entering the worship room everyone is expected to remove their shoes as a sign of respect but also for general cleanliness. However, devotees may not enter the Ashram if they are carrying alcohol, drugs, or meat. As devotee enter the worship room they approach the Ramayana which is covered with an embroidered cloth and is kept on a platform covered with a special canopy.

Each devotee kneels before the Ramayana and makes their offering of prayer and money. It is not essential that devotees offer money and some may wish to donate food towards the Langar. The devotees then retreat to find a place to sit down. Usually a picture of Valmiki is placed in front of the Ramayana to help focus concentration and incense sticks are lit to purify the air.

Everyone sits on the floor to show that everyone is equal in the eyes of God, regardless of whether they come from a rich or poor background. However, it is usually found that men and women sit separately. The women tend to sit on the left side of the room whilst the men sit on the right. There is no Balmiki religious significance for this except for Sikh traditional influence on the community.

There is no special day for worship during the week, but since work restricts one’s availability for worship, most Balmiki’s attend the Ashram on Sundays. Devotees are at liberty to come and go at any time during the Pooja service, which usually lasts about three hours.

The Pooja begins by everyone standing up to say a prayer which is called the Ardas (Balmiki), then the Poojari' (Priest) begins to read sections of the Ramayana.

At short intervals reading from the Ramayana will stop and devotees will be called to the platform to preach and sing hymns. At the end of the Pooja the whole congregation will stand and say a prayer called the Arthi.

The Arthi is followed by the distribution of Karah Prashad, which is made from flour, sugar, butter and water. Karah Parshad is given to each devotee who has come to hear the Ramayana. The food is taken from one bowl only and is a symbol of unity.

Eventually, all the devotees will congregate in the Langar hall, for a meal, for which no one has to pay. All are welcome to share the Langar, which is always vegetarian. Sharing of food together is designed to unite people from all sections of the society and to promote equality between all human beings.

In some Ashrams, a Guru Granth Sahib is kept alongside the Ramayana and Mazhabi Sikhs worship together with Balmikis.

== Ashrams in different countries ==
=== Great Britain ===
In Britain, Ashrams come in various sizes. Some tend to be specially constructed, whilst others tend to be renovated buildings designed to enable the purpose of worship.
