= Ardaas Karaan =

Ardaas Karaan may refer to:

- Ardaas Karaan (album), 2010 Punjabi-language album by Indian singer Nachhatar Gill
- Ardaas Karaan (film), a 2019 Indian Punjabi-language social drama film

== See also ==
- Ardaas, a form of prayer in Indian religions
- Ardaas, a 2016 Indian Punjabi-language film, followed by Ardaas Karaan
