= Dalit Christian =

Dalit caste convert to Christianity

Dalit Christians
Total population
- Above 70% of Indian Christians; 90-95% of Pakistani Christians

Regions with significant populations
- India and Pakistan (majority); Bangladesh and Nepal (minority)

Religions
- Christianity

Scriptures
- Bible

A Dalit Christian or Christian Dalit is someone who has converted to Christianity from another religion in the Indian subcontinent and remains categorised as Dalits in Hindu, Christian, Muslim, and Sikh societies in South Asia. About 90 to 95% of Pakistani Christians are Dalits from the Chuhra caste, and over 70% of Indian Christians are Scheduled Castes, categorised thus by the greater societal practices in various parts of the Indian subcontinent.

Despite their conversion to Christianity, this group often continues to face societal discrimination—both within and outside their religious community due to the pervasive influence of the caste system. Although Christian missionaries during the colonial era aimed to dismantle the caste hierarchy within the Church, the traces of caste-based practices persist in some Christian communities with practices and rituals distinct from other Christians.

== Caste system ==
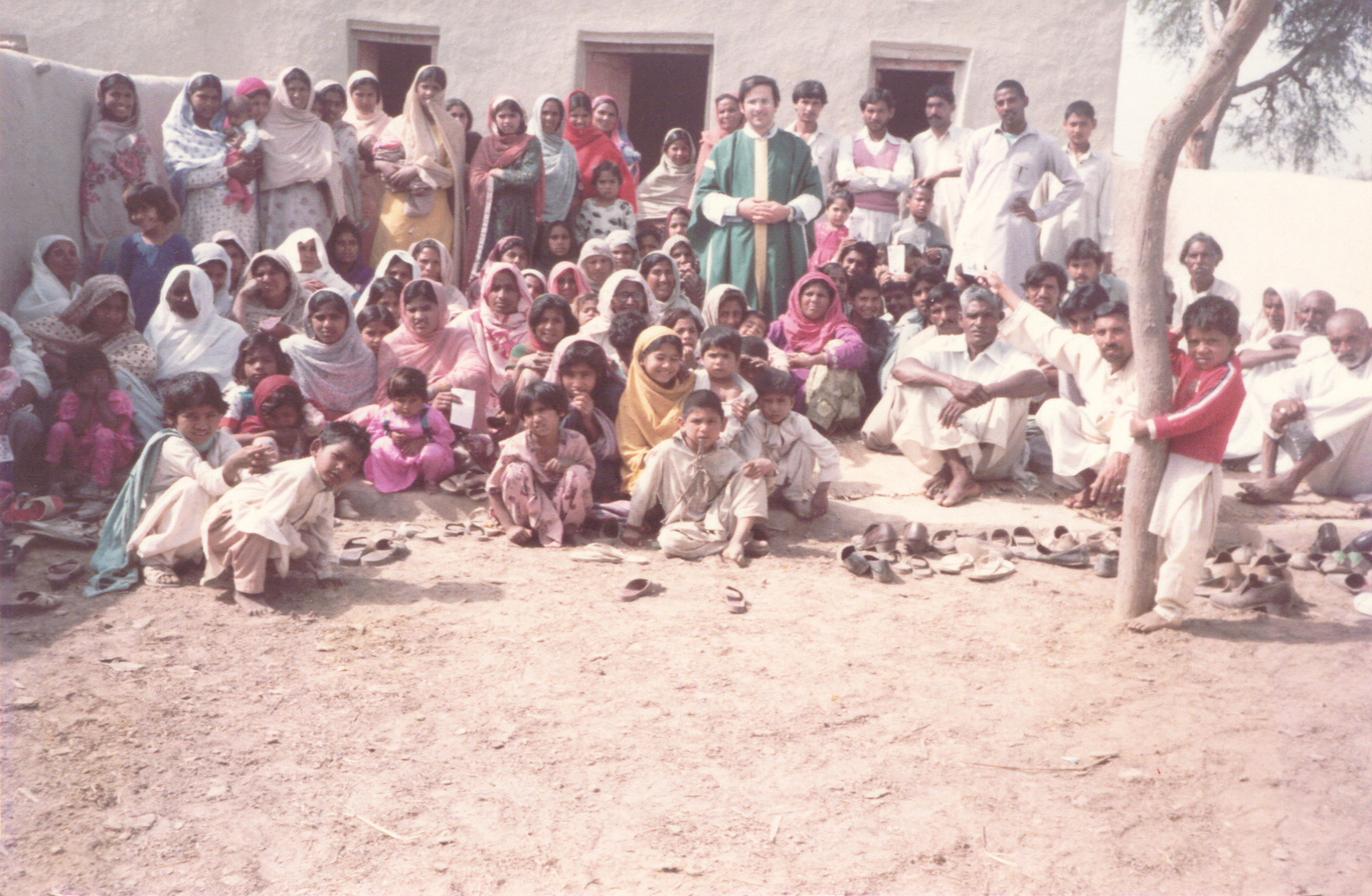
Punjabi Christians with the Missionary Society of St. Paul (May 2006)

Christian missionaries who were evangelising in colonial India fought against the idea of a caste system within church. Yet, some within the different branches of Christianity in South Asia still engage in societal practices with regard to the caste system, along with all its customs and norms, to varying degrees depending on their background. Though other Christians in the Indian subcontinent may not practice a caste culture themselves, they may face societal discrimination outside their Christian community for the caste they belong to. Asif Aqeel and Sama Faruqi documented in Herald Magazine:

In 1947, there were two types of Christians in what was then known as West Pakistan: landless, unskilled, poor labourers and peasants living in villages across central Punjab, and educated Christian professionals, mostly Anglo-Indians and Goans, who lived in big cities such as Karachi and Lahore. The former are generally converts to Christianity from low-caste Hindus and the latter from upper-caste Hindus as well as Muslims. Anglo-Indians and Goans immediately faced discrimination in jobs and business opportunities in the newly created Pakistan. Their rather privileged social status under the Raj – that prized their English language skills and British cultural mannerisms – started waning. Punjabi Christians, on the other hand, were always treated with contempt due to their caste and their dark skin.

Within the three major Christian branches in South Asia, there have been different levels of caste acceptance. The Protestant churches have been most consistent among the Christian community in repudiating it as part of the Hindu social order while attempting to establish a caste-less Christian community. The Roman Catholic Church is said to sometimes develop a more culturally consistent view, treating the caste system as part of the Indian social structure and, for much of its history in India; similarly, the Syrian Orthodox Churches have sometimes responded in like fashion, except it has tended to collectively act as one caste within the caste system instead of maintaining different castes within their churches. However, Protestant churches have fared no better than Catholic churches though mainly Dalit dioceses have Dalit Bishops. The presence of caste among Indian churches persists in the non-acceptance of a Dalit priest, separate entrance for Dalits in churches, separate seating, and other features.

In Kerala, there are several documented events of this discrimination. Dalit Christians in colonial Kerala faced severe discrimination despite their conversion, remaining at the bottom of the social hierarchy. Syrian Christians in Kerala played a significant role in the slave trade during the Dutch colonial period, often acting as agents for the Dutch East India Company. Church buildings were used as slave warehouses and even as venues for public slave auctions, highlighting the connection between the religious institution and the practice of slavery. Early converts, who were only allowed to live in temporary huts on upper-caste landlords' properties, sought land from missionaries to construct their own churches because they were being forced out of these churches from the upper castes. Dalit churches, often made of sticks, mud, and straw, were often attacked and burned down by upper-caste Hindus and prominent Muslim groups. Despite this opposition, conversion to Christianity became a mass movement among the Dalits, who found strength in composing and singing songs that broke the restrictions of upper-caste language. Within churches, Dalit Christians experienced continued discrimination, such as being forced to sit at the back during services or being relegated to separate areas in cemeteries. This discrimination persisted well into the early 20th century, with caste-based violence and social divisions remaining prevalent in Kerala churches.

Other major factors affecting Dalit Christians and other Christians within India in regard to caste statutes are the regional variances in maintaining the caste system. Rural communities are said to hold more strongly to the caste system than the urban communities and Roman Catholics are the majority of Christians in these communities. The urban areas tend to have the least pressure to maintain caste classes and Protestant churches are aid to be best represented in this background.

After conversion, people in India lose any privileges they had in their former caste, while those in lower castes often gain more opportunities. Although a significant number of Indian Christians are unofficially reported to be Dalit Christians, the Sachar Committee on Muslim Affairs reported that only 9% of Indian Christians have Scheduled Caste status, with a further 32.8% having Scheduled Tribe status, and 24.8% belonging to other disadvantaged groups.

In the 1990s there were protests against those Christian organizations that still practiced some form of the caste system and for discrimination in leadership positions; Dalits saw those practices as contrary to Jesus's egalitarianism. Dalit Christians have frequently criticized the Church for not just tolerating but hiding the discriminatory practices among Dalit Christians.

Leonard Fernando, G. Gispert-Sauch writes that: "Today, no Indian Christian think would approve or speak of tolerating the caste reality. There are many, however, who live in it." Dalits that have become Christians in south India have transformed their position as just spectators in Hindu religious practice to that of leaders and representatives of the Christian religion; they have also become influential promoters of Dalit political aspirations.

== Reservation ==
Reservation is available to Dalits who follow Hinduism, Buddhism, and Sikhism, but Dalit Christians and Muslims are not protected as castes under Indian Reservation policy. The Indian constitution in 1950 abolished untouchability, converting those castes to scheduled castes and tribes: in doing so it also provided a system of affirmative action (called the Reservation Policy) whereby 22.5 percent of all government and semi-government jobs including seats in Parliament and state legislatures were reserved for those in those castes; the law also set aside space for admission to schools and colleges. In 1980 the constitutional policy was extended to cover the rest of the 3,743 backward castes in the country. But Christians who claim to belong to no caste are not included in the quotas, meaning those Dalits who convert to Christianity are no longer part of the affirmative action program run by the government. Dalit Christians have now appealed to the government to extend the benefits of reservation policy to Dalit Christians to improve their employment opportunities. In 2008, a study commissioned by the National Commission for Minorities suggested extension of reservation to Dalit Muslims and Dalit Christians. According to the study, Indian Muslims and Christians should be brought under the ambit of the constitutional safeguards.

== Songs ==
Dalit Christian songs emerged as a significant medium for the expression of social change and emancipation in 19th century Kerala. Through these songs, the Dalit community in Kerala, primarily consisting of the Pulaya and Paraya castes, found a means to challenge the oppressive caste system and the practice of caste-based slavery. These songs became an important part of the cultural and religious life of the converted Dalit Christians. During the medieval period in Kerala, caste slavery and the sale of lower caste persons were prevalent social institutions. The arrival of the Portuguese in 1498 and the Dutch in 1603 strengthened the slave trading networks. The Portuguese era saw the Christian conversion of slave castes, and many Pulayas were baptized with Portuguese names. Syrian Christians, a significant part of Kerala society, were major slaveholders and played a crucial role in the sale of slaves.

In the 19th century, Christian missionaries and native preachers composed and performed songs that carried anti-slavery and anti-caste messages. The songs were composed in modern Malayalam, making them accessible to a wider audience, and were often performed at roadside gatherings.

Oh God!
Hear our heartbreaking cries
Cleared forest and made it into land
We made our small huts as home
These people are thrown into the wilderness
Half dead and half alive (Oh God)
Made to plough fields yoked with bull and oxen
When they become frail
Beaten to death and buried (2)
Lord of creation heard our cries on the cross
Showed us the path of mercy (Oh God)
And we remember the color of his mercy
Fell down fatigued with the heavy load
Fell down exhausted
Found too frail and beaten up mercilessly
Bundled together and thrown into the wild
Half alive and half dead (Oh God)
Six days after delivery
Mother went out for work
Left the sleeping baby under the shade of a tree
Returned to find ant-eaten remains
Lord of creation heard our cries on the cross
Showed us the path of mercy
And we remember the color of his mercy (Oh God)
Europeans came among us
Slaves were freed with gospels (2)

— Ayyayyo Daivame (Oh God!)

LMS missionary Samuel Mateer and native missionary Mosavalsala Sastrikal composed songs that were sung with fervor in Dalit congregations. One such popular song, "Adimavela Ozhinju," meaning "Our slavery is over; there is no more slave-work," captured the history of lower-caste slavery in 19th century Kerala.

Our slave work is done, our slave bonds are gone,
For this, we shall never henceforth forsake Thee, O Jesus!
To purchase cattle, fields, houses, and many luxuries (we were sold);
(Now) Messiah himself has settled in the land a people who once fled
in terror (Our).
The father was sold to one place, the mother to another;
The children also separated. But now (Our).
The owners who enslaved us often caused us much suffering;
But will it comfort us to relate all the oppression in full? (Our).
After exhaustion with labour in burning heat, in rain and cold and dew,
They beat us cruelly. With thousands of strokes (Our).
Dogs might enter streets, markets, courts, and lands;
(but) if we went near, they beat and chased us to a distance

— Adima vela ozhinju nammude (our slavery is over; there is no more slave-work)

These songs, which were performed in traditional Carnatic music style, were in stark contrast to the religious practices of the Syrian Christians and the caste-marked language used by Dalits in earlier generations. They symbolized a change in their social life and provided a space for them to liberate their thoughts. The songs influenced Dalit lives and brought changes in their lived experiences. Through the use of modern Malayalam language, Dalits learned new vocabulary, biblical concepts, and even Sanskrit words, thus constructing a new linguistic culture among them.

The testimony of Vettamala Philipose (1900-85), a Dalit pastor in central Kerala, serves as a fine example of how Dalit Christians, persuaded by strong faith, responded to discrimination experienced within churches. After 1924, Syrian Christians conducted several revival meetings in different parts of central Kerala, and Dalits also joined these meetings. Vettamala Philipose, a Dalit pastor from Ranni, once went to listen to Mammen Pastor, a Syrian Christian. When Mammen Pastor saw Philipose, a dark young man, staring at him and keenly listening to his speech, he took a break from his sermon and made a derogatory remark about Philipose's appearance. This comment hurt Philipose, who then stood up and sang a new song,

When the sun of justice comes in His radiance,
I would be cleared of my black colour,
in His second coming, I will be seated beside him like a king"

— Philipose Vettamala, Vettamala Gananga

== See also ==
- Caste system among South Asian Christians
- Dalit theology

== Bibliography ==
- Ashok, Kumar M.; Boopalan, Sunder J. (2015). "Indian Christians in Conflict: Dalit Christian Movement in Contemporary India". In Hunt, Stephen J. (ed.). Handbook of Global Contemporary Christianity: Themes and Developments in Culture, Politics, and Society. Brill Handbooks on Contemporary Religion. Vol. 10. Leiden: Brill Publishers. pp. 308–324. doi:10.1163/9789004291027_017. ISBN 978-90-04-26538-7. ISSN 1874-6691.
