= Ardaas =

Valmiki ritual

Ardaas is a Balmiki ritual performed in the Ashram at the beginning of the community service called Puja. It is performed standing facing the murti of Valmiki with hands folded, and the following words are repeated (in Punjabi):

Oh Lord we stand before you and pray, we beg for your protection. Bless us to call upon you with every breath we take and beg you to protect us from all sins, guide us so that we always pray to you. Bless us so that we always do good deeds Oh Lord and Creator of all things. Bless us with peace of mind and infinite wisdom, show us the way of righteousness so our soul be cleansed. Bless us so that we never forget your teaching Oh Lord and that we shall sing your praises, light candles and incense, Oh Lord those who pray to you with all their heart shall go and meet you in heaven. Oh Lord those who read and listen to your holy scriptures, you are so merciful upon them. Oh Lord we beg you to show us the way so that we can be spared from evil.
