= Caste system among South Asian Christians =

The caste system among South Asian Christians often reflects stratification by sect, location, and the caste of their predecessors. There exists evidence to show that Christian individuals have mobility within their respective castes. But, in some cases, social inertia caused by their old traditions and biases against other castes remain, causing caste system to persist among South Asian Christians, to some extent. Christian priests, nuns, Dalits and similar groups are found in India, Pakistan, Bangladesh, and Nepal.

== Regions ==
=== Kerala (Malabar region) ===
Saint Thomas Christians and Knanaya in Kerala belong to different denominations. Intermarriage between different ethnic groups is rare. Saint Thomas Christians in Kerala, composed of the Malankara Orthodox Syrian Church, Jacobite Syrian Christian Church, CSI Syrian Christians, Mar Thoma Syrian Church, Pentecostal Syrian Christians, St Thomas Evangelical Church of India, Malabar Independent Syrian Church, Syro-Malabar Church, Syro-Malankara Catholic Church, Chaldean Syrian Church, and the endogamous subcaste of Knanaya form ~4% of the Christians in the state. Pentecostal Saint Thomas Christians are the ethnic Saint Thomas Christians (Nasranis) affiliated to various Pentecostal and independent Neo-Charismatic churches.

The Dalit and Nadar Christians of the state combined form 2.6% of the Christian community. Denominations dominated by Dalits include the Anglican Church of India of V. J. Stephen and Church of God (Kerala State).

In the colonial period, many lower castes were converted to Christians by the European Missionaries but the new converts were not allowed to join the Saint Thomas Christian community and they continued to be considered as untouchables even by the Syrian Christians. However, due to evangelical missions of Syrian Christian Churches starting from late 19th century, a considerable population of lower-castes (in some cases even outside Kerala) are part of some Syrian Christian Churches such as the Mar Thoma and CSI churches. The Saint Thomas Christians claim to derive status within the caste system from the tradition that they were elites who were evangelized by Thomas the Apostle. Anand Amaladass says that "The Syrian Christians had inserted themselves within the Indian caste society for centuries and were regarded by the Hindus as a caste occupying a high place within their caste hierarchy." Saint Thomas Christians followed the same rules of caste and pollution as that of Hindus and they were considered as pollution neutralizers. Rajendra Prasad, an Indian historian, said that the Syrian Christians took ritual baths after physical contact with lower castes.

=== Goa (Konkan) and Canara ===
In Portuguese Bombay and Bassein, Portuguese Goa and Damaon and other Portuguese Indian possessions, conversions of entire villages were carried out by Catholic missionaries from the Portuguese conquest of Goa from 1510 onwards. The Portuguese clergy imposed Portuguese surnames on the converts at the time of Baptism so that it would be difficult to know their original caste easily. The Portuguese authorities also suppressed untouchability among the converts and attempted to homogenize them into a single entity.

However, the converted Hindus retained a variation of their caste status based on patrilineal descent from their previous caste affiliations. The new converts were lumped into new Catholic castes. All Brahmin subcastes (Goud Saraswat Brahmins, Padyes, Daivadnyas), goldsmiths and even some rich merchants, were lumped into the Christian caste of Bamonns (Konkani: Brahmins). The converts from the Kshatriya and Vaishya Vani castes became lumped together as Chardos (Kshatriyas) and those Vaishyas who did not become Chardos formed a new caste Gauddos. The converts from all the lower castes, as well as the previously Dalit and adivasi groups, were grouped together as Sudirs, equivalent to Shudras. The converts to Christianity were also not allowed to practice their caste-based Hindu customs because of the Goa Inquisition.

=== Punjab region and the Hindi belt ===
In northern parts of colonial India, there were waves of conversions to Christianity among the Chuhra and Chamar in the Punjab Province and United Provinces of Agra and Oudh; they thus became known as Dalit Christians. The Chuhra sub-castes found in Pakistan and India include the Sahotra, Gill, Khokhar, Mattoo, Bhatti, among other sub-castes.

There were a number of conversions from various forward castes in Moghul-era Bihar, the Bettiah Christian community are descendants of those converts.

=== Sindh ===
In the province of Sindh, Christians of lower castes are often the victims of forced marriages.

=== Tamil Nadu ===
Majority of Christians in the state hail from the Nadar, Mukkuvar, Udayar (caste), and Adi Dravidar. The mass conversion of Paravars date back to the Portuguese era and the conflict over the Pearl Fishery Coast between the Paravars and arabs in the 15th century AD. The Paravars converted 'en masse' to Christianity and became the subjects of the Portuguese king. The Nadar conversion to Christianity dates back to the British Colonial Era in the 18th century. The first to initiate the conversion was at Mylaudy village by German missionary Rev. Ringeltaube. and he built many churches and schools in Kanyakumari district. Later in the 19th century, the Vellalars, the Udaiyars and Schedule castes embraced Christianity. The cohesion of jatis among caste Christians (e.g. Paravas) and the strength of caste leadership are noted by scholars to be much stronger than comparable predominantly Hindu castes in Tamil Nadu. The Christians of Tamil Nadu denote themselves as RC (Roman Catholic) Paravar, RC Nadar, CSI Nadar etc., i.e., they use a combination of the Church and their Hindu caste name. Robert L. Hardgrave, a Professor of Humanities, notes in his work The Nadars of TamilNadu.. that a Christian Nadar would enter into a marital alliance with a Hindu Nadar but never with a Christian of another caste and that they would dine with their Hindu brethren but never with a person of their own faith who was beneath them in the social scale. As per a native pastor, "Caste sticks to the people as closely as their skins. The blood of caste was thicker than the spirit of religion."

=== Nepal ===
In Nepal, Christians often enter into canonically interfaith marriages with members of the same caste.

== Under the law ==
Indian law does not provide benefits for Scheduled Caste Christians. Christians have been advocating for the same rights given to Hindu, Buddhist, and Sikh Scheduled castes. Despite the activists' point that Christians are a casteless society, discrimination does not go away easily and Dalits seek equal rights irrespective of the religion they profess.

Some Christians also oppose the proposed labeling of "Christian Scheduled castes" because they feel their identity may be assimilated. Pastor Salim Sharif of the Church of North India notes "We are becoming another class and caste."

== Caste discrimination among Christians ==
=== Criticism ===
Many Catholics have spoken out against discrimination against them by members of the Catholic Church. A Dalit activist with the nom-de-plume Bama Faustina has written books that are critical of the discrimination by the nuns and priests of the Catholic Church in South India. During 2003 ad limina visits of the bishops of India, Pope John Paul II criticized the caste discrimination in the Catholic Church in India when addressing bishops of the ecclesiastical provinces of Madras-Mylapore, Madurai and Pondicherry-Cuddalore, the three archbishops of Tamil Nadu. He went on to say: "It is the Church's obligation to work unceasingly to change hearts, helping all people to see every human being as a child of God, a brother or sister of Christ, and therefore a member of our own family".

=== Dalit Christians ===
Mass conversions of lower caste Hindus to Christianity and Islam took place in order to escape the discrimination. The main Dalit groups that participated in these conversions were the Chuhras of Punjab, Chamars of North India (Uttar Pradesh, Bihar and Madhya Pradesh), Vankars of Gujarat, Adi Dravida (Paraiyan, Pulaiyar, Valluvar, Koliyar, Pallan) of Tamil Nadu and Pulayas of Kerala. They believed that “Christianity is a true religion; a desire for protection from oppressors and, if possible, material aid; the desire for education for their children; and the knowledge that those who have become Christians had improved”. Christianity was thought to be egalitarian and could provide mobility away from the caste. Even after conversion, in some cases, Dalits were discriminated against due to the “residual leftover” practice of caste discrimination from their previous traditions. This is attributed to the predominant Hindu society they lived in. Sometimes the only change seen was their personal religious identity. In many cases they were still referred to by their Hindu caste names. Examples include Pulayans in Kerala, Adi Dravida Paraiyan in Tamil Nadu and Madigas in Andhra Pradesh, who are discriminated by members of all religious backgrounds.

The first people converted by Jesuits of the Madura Mission to Christianity were members of Nadars, Maravars and Pallar. Caste based occupations held by Dalits also show a clear segregation which perpetuated even after becoming Christian. Occupational patterns (including manual scavenging) that are prevalent among Dalit Christians in north-west India are said to be quite similar to that of Dalit Hindus. Occupational discrimination for Dalit Christians goes so far as to restrict not only employment but in some cases for clean sanitation and water. Inter-caste marriage among Christians is also not commonly practiced. For example, Syrian Christians in Kerala do not marry Dalit Christians. Even intermarriage between Bamons and Shudras in Goa is quite uncommon. Sometimes marriage to a higher class Hindu is preferred to marriage to a Dalit Christian. Discrimination against Dalit Christians also remained in interactions and mannerisms between castes. For example, during the earlier days the 'lower caste Christians' had to close their mouth when talking to a Syrian Christian. Even after conversion segregation, restriction, hierarchy and graded ritual purity remained to some extent. Data shows that there is more discrimination and less class mobility among the people living in the rural areas, where the incidence of caste discrimination is higher among people from all religious backgrounds .

In many cases, the churches referred to the Dalits as 'New Christians'. It is alleged to be a derogatory term which classifies the Dalit Christians to be looked down upon by other Christians. During the earlier days of Christianity, in some churches in south India the Dalits had either separate seating or had to attend the mass from outside. Dalit Christians are also said to be grossly underrepresented amongst the clergy in some places.

== See also ==
- Christianity in India
- Caste system among South Asian Muslims
- Dalit theology
