= Orthodoxy in India =

Orthodoxy in India may refer to:

- Eastern Orthodoxy in India, representing adherents, communities and institutions of various Eastern Orthodox Churches in India
- Oriental Orthodoxy in India, representing adherents, communities and institutions of various Oriental Orthodox Churches in India
- Sunni Islam in India, representing adherents, communities and institutions of the major branch of Islam in India
- Orthodox Judaism in India, representing adherents, communities and institutions of Orthodox Judaism in India; see History of the Jews in India
- Orthodox Hinduism in India, a term for Sanātanī

== See also ==
- Orthodoxy (disambiguation)
- India (disambiguation)
- Orthodox Church (disambiguation)
