= Arvind P. Nirmal =

Dalit Christian theologian

Arvind P. Nirmal, (1936–1995) was a Dalit Christian theologian and a minister of the Church of North India. He questioned the Christian conversion of the upper castes, especially the Brahmin. A major proponent of Dalit theology, Nirmal argued that Jesus himself was a Dalit and that Christian theology should therefore reflect Dalit concerns.

Nirmal criticised Brahminic dominance of Christian theology in India, and believed that the application of liberation theology to India should reflect the struggle of Dalits, and also criticised the Marxist element within South American liberation theology. He drew on the concept of the Suffering Servant in Isaiah 53 to identify Jesus himself as a Dalit – "a waiter, a dhobi, and bhangi."

== Early life ==
Arvind Paulus Nirmal was born on 9 May 1936 in Jalna, Maharashtra. His father was an ordained priest of the Church of North India, and his mother Sonubai was a teacher. He spent his early years in Jalna, attending school and went to college at Milind Mahavidyalaya in Aurangabad. After studying for his BD at UTC Bangalore he was ordained a priest in the Church of North India and he served as a rural pastor for several years in the Jalna area, including at Kharpudi and Dahipuri villages. Before moving to Dahipuri, he would travel the distance on his bicycle. He was again selected to do his M.Th (Masters in Theology) at UTC Bangalore, where he then joined as a faculty, teaching systematic theology during the period 1968–1981.

== Education ==
Arvind Nirmal obtained a Bachelor of Arts degree from Milind Mahavidyalaya in Aurangabad, Maharashtra.

=== Spiritual studies ===
During the early 1960s, Nirmal became an aspirante and studied Bachelor of Divinity (BD) during the years 1962-1965 at the United Theological College, Bangalore during the Principalship of the Systematic Theologian Joshua Russell Chandran. Nirmal's companions during that period included Regunta Yesurathnam, G. T. Abraham, Wesley Ariarajah Dhyanchand Carr and others while his seniors comprised K. C. Abraham, C. L. Furtado, M. J. Joseph, among others. In the ensuring convocation of the Senate of Serampore College (University), Nirmal was awarded a B. D. by then Registrar, Chetti Devasahayam.

After a year of pastoral ministry, Nirmal rejoined the Theologiate in 1966 to pursue an advanced course leading to Master of Theology specializing in Systematic theology with a research proposal entitled An evaluation of Origen's concept of the world in the light of the Christian theological task in relation to the Vedanta philosophy based on which the university awarded an M. Th. in the year 1969, again by Chetti Devasahayam, then Registrar. The Franciscan Friar J. A. G. Gerwin van Leeuwen, OFM was a companion of Nirmal during the period 1966-1968 at UTC, Bangalore.

=== Overseas study exposure ===
Joshua Russell Chandran wrote in 1997 that Nirmal was sent to Canada where he earned a Diploma in Christian Studies from the United Theological College of Montreal, Canada and was also sent to Oxford later in 1973 to study at Keble College, where he pursued postgraduate study.

== Publications ==
- (with V. Devasahayam), A Reader in Dalit Theology, Gurukul Lutheran Theological College & Research Institute, 1990, 180 pages.
- Nirmal, Arvind P.ed. "Towards a Common Dalit Ideology." Madras: Gurukul Lutheran Theological College & Research Institute, 1989, 132 pages.
