= Pargat Diwas =

Birth festival of Hindu sage, Valmiki

Valmiki Jayanti
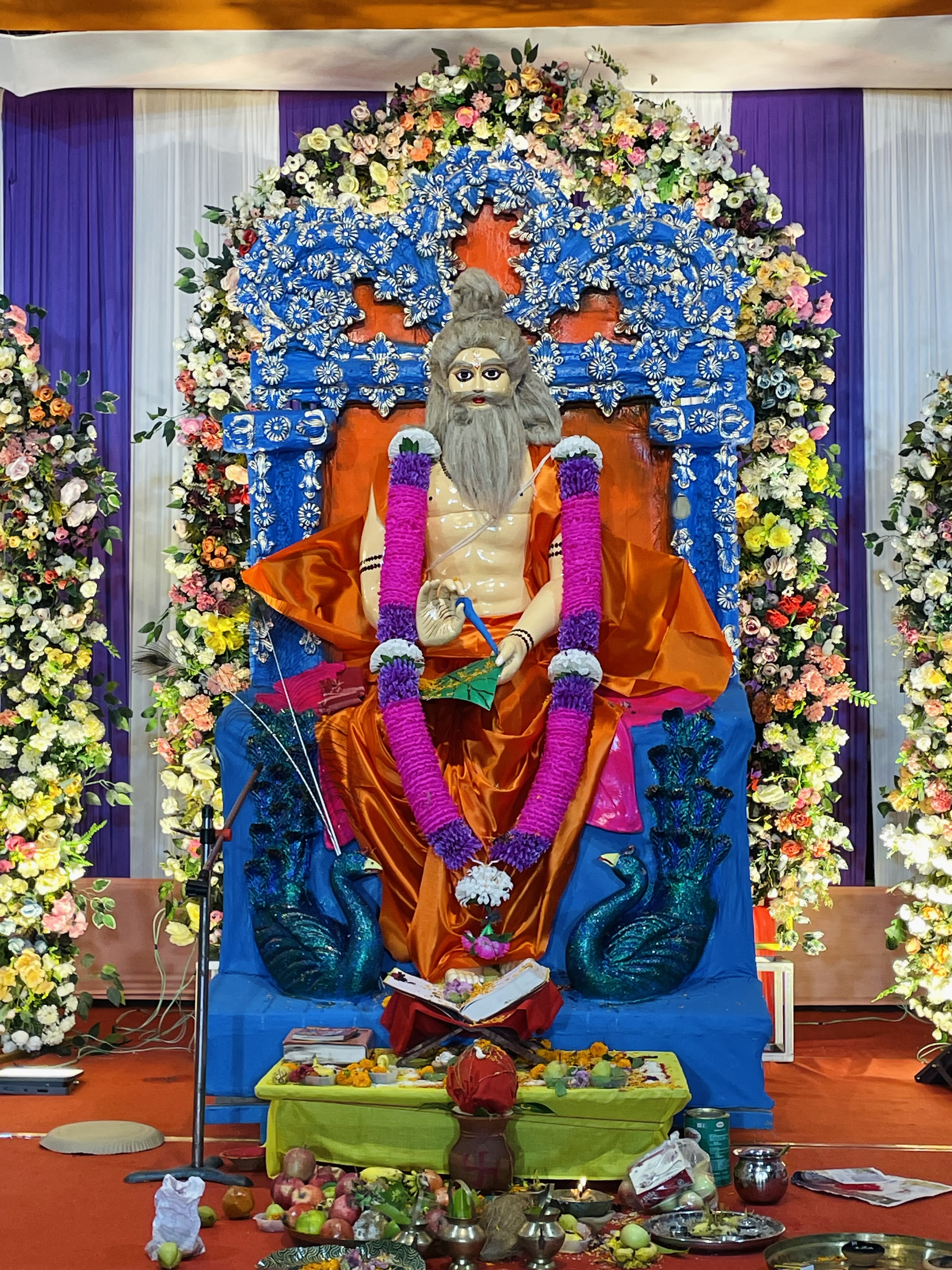
- Idol of Sage Valmiki on the occasion of Valmiki Jayanti at Bihutali, Duliajan in 2024
- Observed by: Nepal and India
- Type: Religious
- Significance: Commemorate famous sage Maharishi Valmiki
- Date: Purnima Tithi of Ashwina Month
- 2025 date: 7 October
- Frequency: Annual

Pargat Diwas, or Valmiki Jayanti, is an annual Indian festival celebrated in particular by the Balmiki religious group, to commemorate the birth of the ancient Indian poet and philosopher Valmiki, who is thought to have lived around 500 BCE. The festival date is determined by the Indian lunar calendar, and falls on the full moon (Purnima) of the month of Ashwin, typically in late September or early October.

Valmiki is revered in India as the author of the Indian epic poem Ramayana, and is also worshipped as the avatar of God by members of the Balmiki sect. Valmiki himself appears as a major character in the Ramayana, as a monk who receives the banished queen Sita into his hermitage and acts as teacher to her twin sons, Lava and Kusha. The "epic metre" in traditional Indian poetry is attributed to Valmiki, with verses consisting of memorable rhyming couplets, suggesting that the poem was intended for public recitation, a common Indian oral tradition.

On Pargat Diwas, portraits of Valmiki, typically depicted as a monk wearing saffron-coloured robes and holding a quill and paper, are paraded in processions called Shobha Yatra through the main streets of the Balmiki sect's locality, accompanied by street devotional singing.
