= Matadin Bhangi =

Indian first freedom fighter

Matadin Valmiki
- Born: Meerut, Company India
- Died: Company India
- Occupation: British East India Company
- Known for: Indian independence fighter

Matadin Valmiki was an Indian freedom fighter who played a key part in the events immediately preceding the outbreak of the Indian rebellion of 1857. He sowed seeds of the 1857 revolt.

== History ==
He was a Valmiki worker in a cartridge manufacturing unit of British East India Company. Working with leather and animal hide was considered as the occupation of low castes. One day Matadin asked Mangal Pandey, serving as a soldier, for water, but due to the caste difference, Pandey refused. Matadin made him realise that it was paradoxical to be proud of a high Caste Brahmin family, but still use cartridges made with the fat of cows and pigs. This propelled both Hindu and Muslim soldiers of the company to raise the banner of revolt.

According to subaltern historians and Dalit activists, he should be recognised as the instigator of the revolt of 1857, because he made Pandey aware that their religious sentiments were not respected by the British.

== Legacy ==
In 2015, Meerut Municipal Corporation named Hapur Adda crossing at Meerut as Shaheed Matadin Chowk as a tribute to him.

== See also ==
- Barrackpore Mutiny of 1824
- Chetram Jatav
- Banke Chamar
- Mangal Pandey
- Gangu Baba
