= Dalit theology =

Christian theology concerned with the Dalit caste

Dalit theology is a branch of Christian theology that emerged among the Dalit caste in the Indian subcontinent in the 1980s. It shares a number of themes with Latin American liberation theology, which arose two decades earlier, including a self-identity as a people undergoing Exodus. Dalit theology sees hope in the "Nazareth Manifesto" of Luke 4, where Jesus speaks of preaching "good news to the poor ... freedom for the prisoners and recovery of sight for the blind" and of releasing "the oppressed."

== Development ==
A major proponent of Dalit theology was Arvind P. Nirmal (1936–1995), a Dalit Christian in the Church of North India. Nirmal criticised Brahminic dominance of Christian theology in India, and believed that the application of liberation theology to India should reflect the struggle of Dalits, who make up about 70% of the Christians in India, as claimed by Poor Christian Liberation Movement (PCLM), and 90% of the Christians in Pakistan. Nirmal also criticised the Marxist element within South American liberation theology. Nirmal drew on the concept of the Suffering Servant in Isaiah 53 to identify Jesus himself as a Dalit – "a waiter, a dhobi, and bhangi."

Evelyn Ruth Bhajan, a deacon in the Church of Pakistan, stated that Dalit theology is vital in that it aligns the Church's mission with "strategies based on the social, political and economic implications of liberation in Christ." Bhajan stated that this liberation includes that from persecution, segregation, and economic depression.

Dalit theologians have seen passages in the gospels, such as Jesus' sharing a common drinking vessel with the Samaritan woman in John 4 as indicating his embracing of Dalitness. The parable of the Good Samaritan is also seen as significant, providing a "life-giving message to the marginalized Dalits and a challenging message to the non-Dalits."

M. E. Prabhakar expanded on the Dalitness of Jesus, stating that "the God of the Dalits ... does not create others to do servile work, but does servile work Himself." He also suggested that Jesus experienced human, and especially Dalit, brokenness in his crucifixion. Prabhakar has developed a Dalit creed, which reads in part:

"Our cries for liberation from harsh caste-bondage
Were heard by God, who came to us in Jesus Christ
To live with us and save all people from their sins."

Vedanayagam Devasahayam (b. 1949) of the Church of South India followed Nirmal as head of Dalit theology at the Gurukul Lutheran Theological College, and further developed Nirmal's ideas, writing a number of books. Devasahayam later became bishop of the Church of South India's Madras Diocese.

Dalit theology opposes indigenization movements within Indian Christian liturgy, since these are seen as reinforcing traditional caste hierarchies. However, the incorporation of some Indian religious traditions is supported.

== Literature ==
- Arvind P. Nirmal and V. Devasahayam, A Reader in Dalit Theology, Gurukul Lutheran Theological College & Research Institute, 1990, 180 pages.
- V. Devasahayam, Outside the Camp: Bible Studies in Dalit Perspective, Gurukul Lutheran Theological College & Research Institute, 1992, 54 pages.
- V. Devasahayam, Doing Dalit Theology in Biblical Key, Dept. of Research and Publications, Gurukul Lutheran Theological College and Research Institute, 1997, 75 pages.
- V. Devasahayam, Frontiers of Dalit Theology, Gurukul Lutheran Theological College & Research Institute / Indian Society for Promoting Christian Knowledge, 1997, 501 pages.
- Masilamani Azariah, A Pastor's Search for Dalit Theology, Indian Society for Promoting Christian Knowledge, 2002, 211 pages.
- Peniel Rajkumar, Dalit Theology and Dalit Liberation: Problems, Paradigms and Possibilities, Ashgate, 2010, 218 pages.
- Keith Hebden, Dalit Theology and Christian Anarchism, Ashgate, 2011, 186 pages.
- Y.T. Vinayaraj, Re-imagining Dalit Theology: Postmodern Readings, CSS, 2010
- Anderson H M Jeremiah, Community and worldview among Paraiyars of South India: 'Lived' religion, Bloomsbury, 2012, 285 pages
- Y.T. Vinayaraj,"Dalit Theology after Continental Philosophy," Palgrave Macmillan, 2016.
- Jobymon Skaria, Dalit Theology, Boundary Crossings, and Liberation in India: A Biblical and Postcolonial Study, London: Bloomsbury, 2022, 223 pages

== See also ==
- Caste system among Indian Christians
- Dalit Christian

== Bibliography ==
- Ashok, Kumar M.; Boopalan, Sunder J. (2015). "Indian Christians in Conflict: Dalit Christian Movement in Contemporary India". In Hunt, Stephen J. (ed.). Handbook of Global Contemporary Christianity: Themes and Developments in Culture, Politics, and Society. Brill Handbooks on Contemporary Religion. Vol. 10. Leiden: Brill Publishers. pp. 308–324. doi:10.1163/9789004291027_017. ISBN 978-90-04-26538-7. ISSN 1874-6691.
