= Valmiki Ashram =

Hindu temple in Nepal

- वाल्मीकि आश्रम
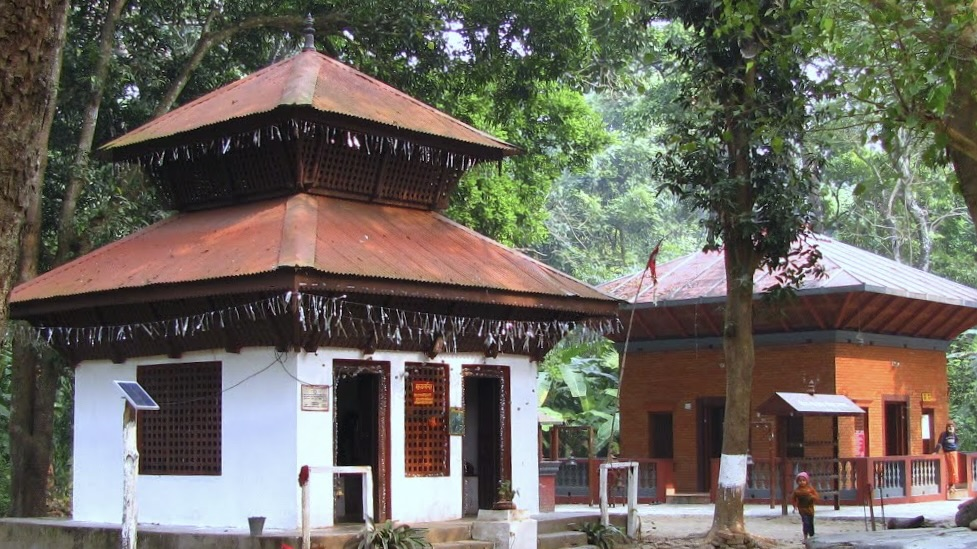

- Location in Nepal

Religion
- Affiliation: Hinduism
- District: Chitwan
- Province: Bagmati Province
- Deity: Ram, Sita, Rishi Valmiki
- Festival: Ram Navami

Location
- Location: Chitwan National Park, Nepal
- Country: Nepal
- Coordinates: 27°26′43.14″N 83°57′12.51″E

Architecture
- Type: Pagoda Style

Website
- www.ddcchitwan.gov.np

Valmiki Ashram (Nepali: वाल्मीकि आश्रम) is a Hindu Balmiki temple situated in Chitwan district of Nepal, inside Chitwan National Park. It is close to the Triveni Dham where Tamasa, Sona and Sapta Gandaki rivers meet. Deities worshipped here include Rama, Sita, and Valmiki. The festival of Rama Navami is also celebrated here.

According to Hindu mythology, it is the place where Rishi Valmiki lived and wrote the Hindu epic, the Ramayana. It is believed that Sita, consort of Lord Rama, came here to stay during pregnancy and it was the place where Lava and Kusha were born.

The temple is accessible by crossing the Triveni river and then by walking or taking a vehicle across the border via the nearby Gandaki barrage.

== See also ==
- Ayodhyapuri
- Triveni Dham
- Janakpur Dham
