= Bhura Singh Valmiki =

Indian freedom fighter

Bhura Singh Valmiki was an Indian freedom fighter and commander-in-chief of the army of the princely state of Ballabhgarh. He led the Ballabhgarh state's army in the Indian Rebellion of 1857 and was hanged on 9 January 1858 in Delhi's Chandni Chowk along with two other leaders of the mutiny.
