= Valmiki =

Legendary Indian poet, author of the Ramayana

Maharishi Valmiki
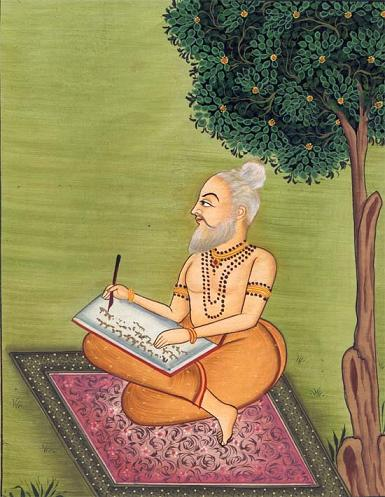
- Sage Valmiki composing the Ramayana

Personal life
- Notable work(s): Ramayana; Yoga Vasistha; Valmiki Samhita
- Known for: Composing the Ramayana; Guru of Lava and Kusha; Avatar of Brahma
- Honors: Adi Kavi; Maharishi

Religious life
- Religion: Hinduism
- Lineage: Rama Mantraraja (mentioned by Govindaraja)
- Movement: Dharmic movement called Valmikism is based on Valmiki's teachings

Valmiki (/vɑːlˈmiːki/; Sanskrit: वाल्मीकि, romanized: Vālmīki, lit. 'from an anthill', [ʋɑːlmiːki]) (Note: Valmiki is also known by devotees as Balmiki, Lal Beg and Bala Shah.) was a legendary poet and Hindu maharishi (sage) who is celebrated as the traditional author of the smriti epic Ramayana, one of Hinduism's two Itihasas, based on the attribution in the text itself. He is revered as Ādi Kavi (Sanskrit: आदिकवि), the first poet, author of Ramayana, the first epic poem.

The Ramayana, originally written by Valmiki, consists of 24,000 shlokas and seven cantos (kaṇḍas). The Ramayana is composed of about 480,002 words, being a quarter of the length of the full text of the Mahabharata or about four times the length of the Iliad. The Ramayana tells the story of a prince, Rama of the city of Ayodhya in the Kingdom of Kosala, whose wife Sita is abducted by Ravana, the demon-king (Rakshasa) of Lanka. The scholars' estimates for the earliest stage of the text ranging from the 8th to 4th centuries BCE, and later stages extending up to the 3rd century CE, although original date of composition is unknown. As with many traditional epics, it has gone through a process of interpolations and redactions, making it impossible to date accurately.

British satirist Aubrey Menen says that Valmiki was "recognized as a literary genius," and thus was considered, "an outlaw," presumably because of his "philosophic scepticism," as part of an "Indian Enlightenment" period. Valmiki is also quoted as being the contemporary of Rama. Menen claims Valmiki is "the first author in all history to bring himself into his own composition."

== Early life ==
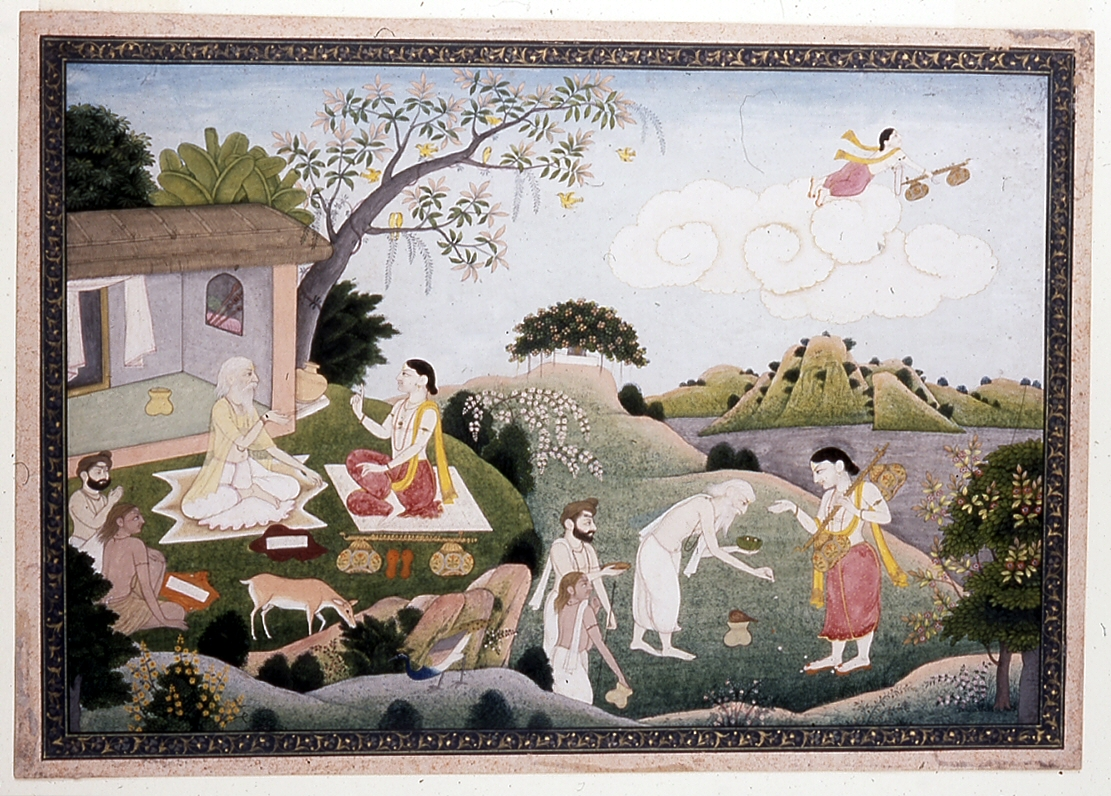
The youthful sage Narada at the white-bearded Valmiki's hermitage

According to scriptures, Valmiki is the tenth son of the god Varuna, born after Varuna's seed fell into a termite hill, which earned him the name of "Valmiki". In his youth, Valmiki once met the great sage Narada and had a discourse with him on his duties. Moved by Narada's words, Valmiki began to perform penance and chanted the word "Mara" which meant "die". As he performed his penance for several years, the word became "Rama", (Note: "mara" repeated several times is -maramaramaramaramaramaramara- which may be read - as well as pronounced - as ramaramaramaramaramaramarama.) a name of the god Vishnu.

There also exist some legends about Valmiki having been a thief before turning into a rishi. The Nagara Khanda of the Skanda Purana in its section on the creation of Mukhara Tirtha mentions that Valmiki was born a Brahmin, with the name of Lohajangha and was a devoted son to his parents. He had a beautiful wife and both of them were faithful to each other. Once, when there was no rain in the region of Anarta, for twelve long years, Lohajangha, for the sake of his hungry family, started robbing people that he found in the forest. In the course of this life he met the seven sages or the Saptarishi and tried to rob them as well. But the learned sages felt pity on him and showed him the folly of his ways. One of them, Pulaha gave him a Mantra to meditate upon and the Brahmin turned thief got so engrossed in its recitation that ant-hills came up around his body. When the sages returned and heard the sound of the mantra coming from the ant-hill, they blessed him and said, "Since you achieved great Siddhi seated within a Valmīka (an anthill), you will become well-known in the world as Vālmīki."

== The first shloka ==
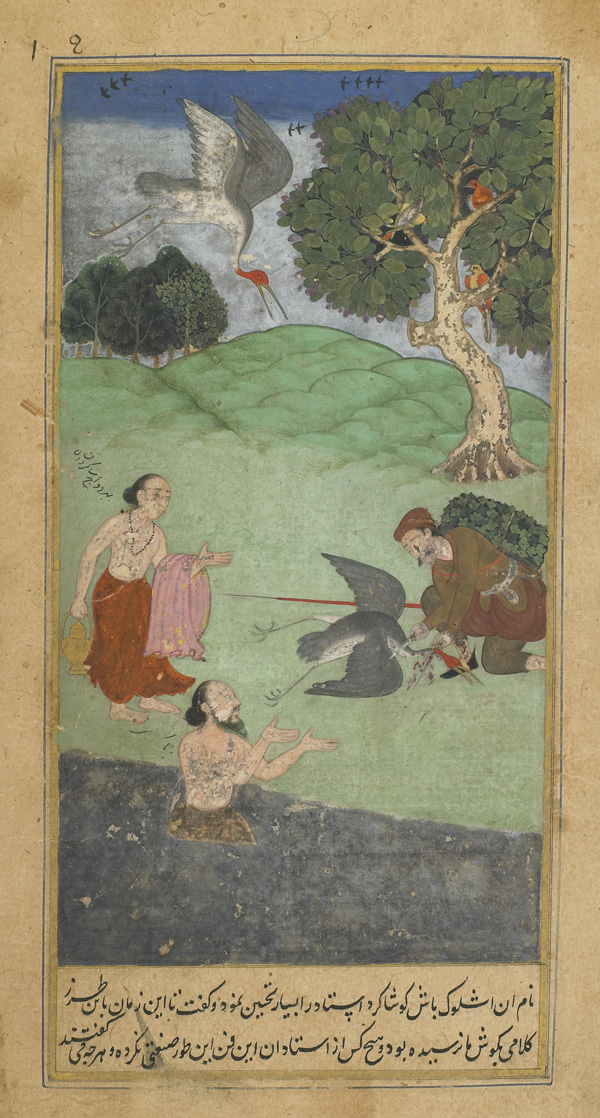
A fowler kills a bird and the cry of its mate gives Valmiki the measures in which he composes the Ramayana

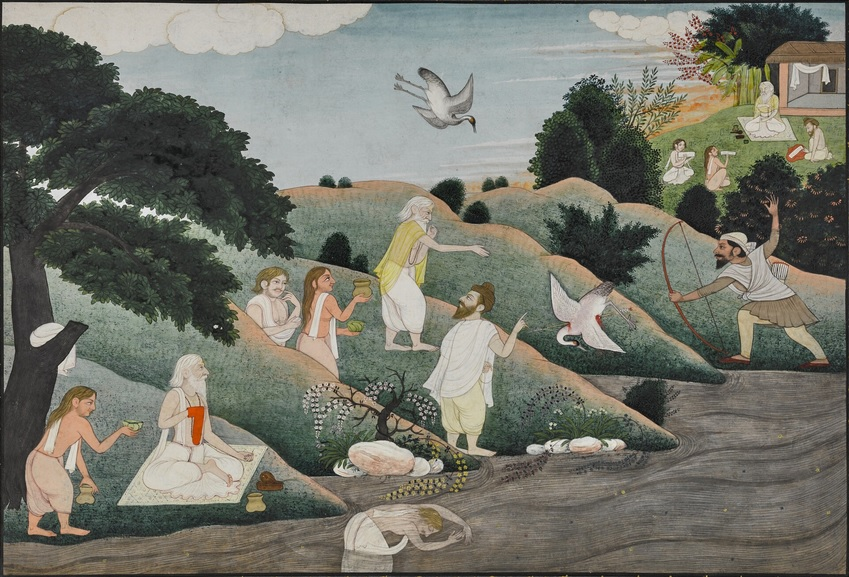
Valmiki and the death of the Sarus crane

Valmiki was going to the river Ganges for his daily ablutions. A disciple by the name Bharadwaja was carrying his clothes. On the way, they came across the Tamasa Stream. Looking at the stream, Valmiki said to his disciple, "Look, how clear is this water, like the mind of a good man! I will bathe here today." When he was looking for a suitable place to step into the stream, he saw a crane couple mating. Valmiki felt very pleased on seeing the happy birds. Suddenly, hit by an arrow, the male bird died on the spot. Filled by sorrow, its mate screamed in agony and died of shock. Valmiki's heart melted at this pitiful sight. He looked around to find out who had shot the bird. He saw a hunter with a bow and arrows, nearby. Valmiki became very angry. His lips opened and he cried out,

मा निषाद प्रतिष्ठां त्वमगमः शाश्वतीः समाः।
यत्क्रौञ्चमिथुनादेकमवधीः काममोहितम्॥'

mā niṣāda pratiṣṭhā tvamagamaḥ śāśvatīḥ samāḥ
yat krauñcamithunādekam avadhīḥ kāmamohitam

You will find no rest for the long years of Eternity
For you killed a bird in love and unsuspecting

Emerging spontaneously from Valmiki's rage and grief, this couplet is considered the first shloka in Sanskrit literature. Valmiki later composed the entire Ramayana in the same meter. Valmiki is revered as Adi Kavi (the first poet); the Ramayana is revered as the first kavya (poem).

== Role in Ramayana ==
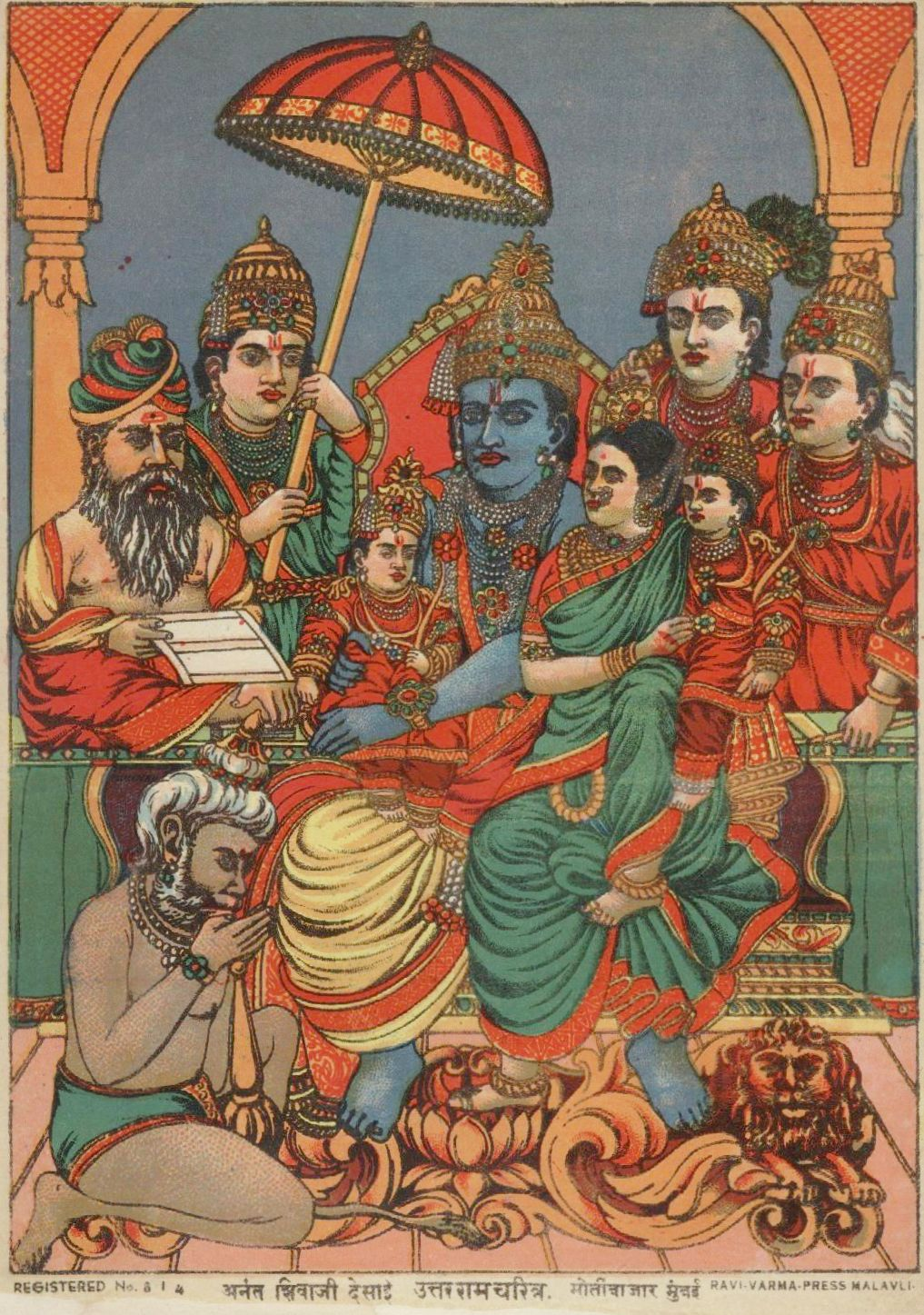
Rama with Sita on the throne, their children Lava and Kusha on their laps. Behind the throne, Lakshmana, Bharata and Shatrughna stand. Hanuman bows to Rama before the throne. Valmiki to the left.

Valmiki played an important role in Uttarakāṇḍa, the last chapter of the epic Ramayana. The Uttarakāṇḍa may not have been originally worked by Valmiki. The scholars Robert and Sally Goldman, for example, have pointed out: "Much of the narrative focuses on figures other than Rāma and is narrated only indirectly by Vālmīki, being placed in the mouths of other figures such as Agastya." It is believed to have been taken up from Sesha Ramayana. According to the legend, Rama sent Sita to the forest. Sita finds refuge in Sage Valmiki's ashram, where she gives birth to twin boys Lava and Kusha. Lava and Kusha were Valmiki's first disciples, to whom he taught the Ramayana. Bala Kanda of the epic also tells the story of Valmiki narrating the Ramayana to Lava and Kusha, who become his disciples.

== Role in Mahabharata ==
Valmiki was alive during the Mahabharata, and he was one of the many sages that visited Yudhisthira after the war. He told Yudhisthira the benefits of worshipping Shiva. Once upon a time, some ascetic possessors of the homa fire cursed Valmiki as guilty of Brahmahatya. The sin possessed him as soon as he was cursed. So he prayed to Shiva and he became cleansed of all his sins. Valmiki told Yudhisthira that he should also pray to Shiva like him.

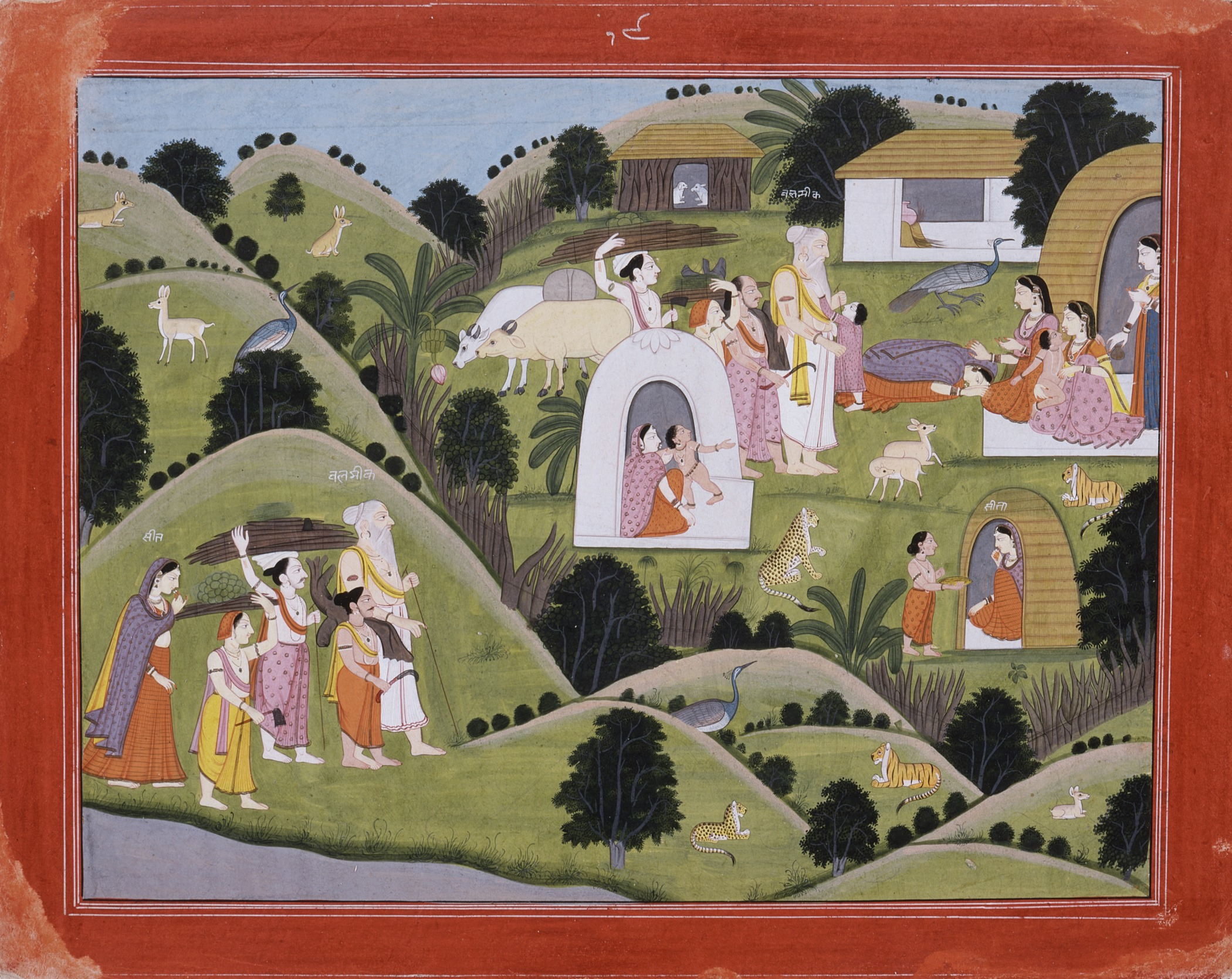
Sita in Valmiki hermitage

== Reincarnation ==
Vishnudharmottara Purana says that Valmiki was born in the Treta Yuga as a form of Brahma who composed Ramayana and that people desirous of earning knowledge should worship Valmiki. He was later reincarnated as Tulsidas, who composed the Ramcharitamanas, which was the Awadhi-Hindi version of the Ramayana.

== Pragat Diwas ==
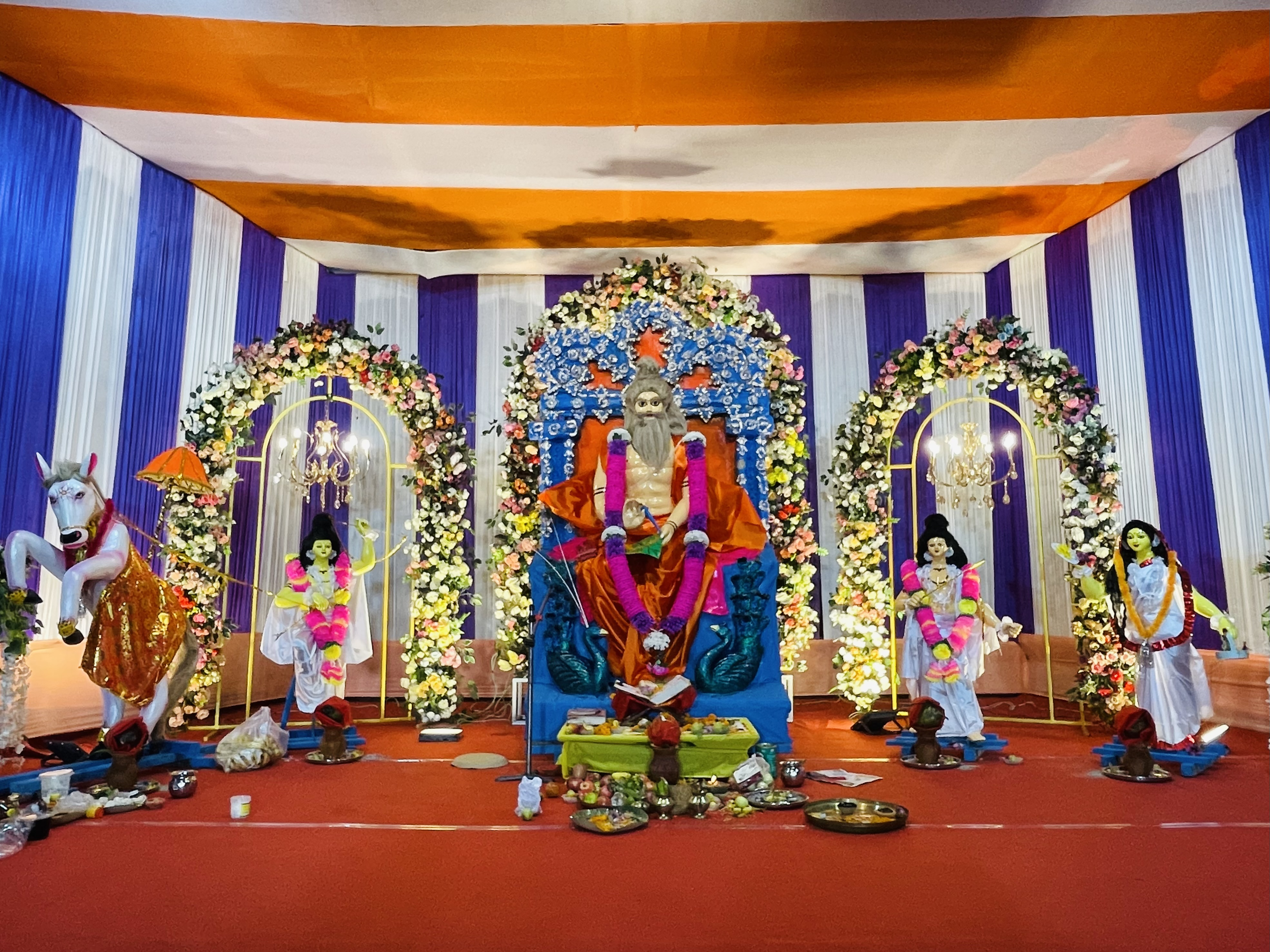
Idol of Sage Valmiki at center, Lava and Kusha on both sides of Valmiki, the horse of Ashwamedha Yajna of Rama at left corner, and Sita on the right corner, at the Valmiki Jayanti celebration at Bihutali, Duliajan.

The full moon day of Hindu month of Ashvin is celebrated as the birth anniversary of the poet. The day is also known as Pargat Diwas or Valmiki Jayanti, and is a major festival of the followers of the Balmiki religious sect of Hinduism.

== Temples ==
The Balmiki sect of Hinduism reveres Valmiki, where he is also known as Lal Beg or Bala Shah, as a patron saint, with a plethora of mandirs (temples) dedicated to him.

In the Siddhar tradition of Tamil Nadu, Valmiki is known as Vanmeegar and is revered as one of the 18 esteemed Siddhars of yore. The Ettukudi Murugan Temple, Nagapattinam is home to his Jeeva Samadhi.

An area in Chennai, Tiruvanmiyur is believed to derive its name from Sage Valmiki, Thiru-Valmiki-Oor. There is a temple for Valmiki located in this place, which is believed to be 1300 years old.

Shree Valmiki Mata Maha Samsthana is a temple dedicated to Valmiki in Rajanahalli, Karnataka.

Valmiki Ashram, a site considered to be the original ashram of Valmiki, is located in Chitwan district of Nepal. The site is near the Triveni Dham pilgrimage site.

== In popular culture ==
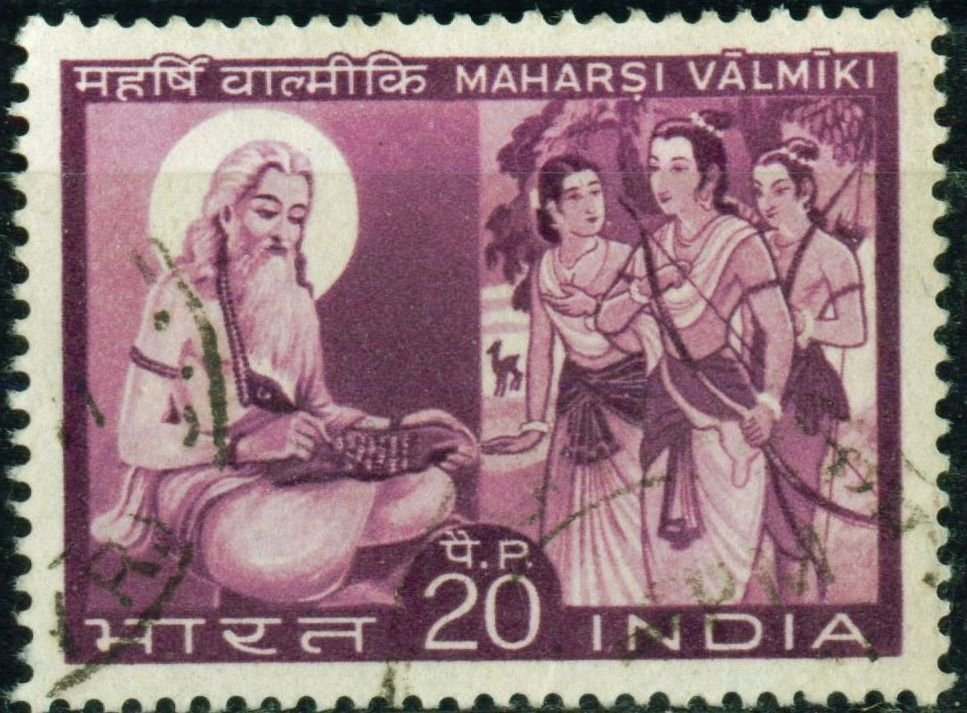
Stamp of India 1970 Maharsi Valmiki Ancient Author

Several Indian films have been made on the life of the poet, beginning with G. V. Sane's Valmiki (1921); it was followed by Surendra Narayan Roy's Ratnakar (1921), Ellis Dungan's Valmiki (1946), Bhalji Pendharkar's Valmiki (1946), Sundarrao Nadkarni's Valmiki (1946), C.S.R. Rao's Valmiki (starring Rajkumar 1963) and Valmiki (starring N. T. Rama Rao; 1963), and Arvind Bhatt's Sant Valmiki (1991).

Bhatt's film which starred Suresh Oberoi in the title role remains unreleased after a case was filed against Oberoi for remarks deemed offensive by members of the Valmiki caste in India.

== See also ==
- Balmiki caste
- Chuhra – Dalit caste in India and Pakistan
- Maithili Maha Upanishad – Sanskrit Upanishad
- Valmikeshwar Nath Mahadev Mandir
- Valmiki Samhita – Sanskrit text attributed to Valmiki
- Vyasa – Sage in ancient India
