= Triveni Dham =

Hindu pilgrimage site in Nepal

- त्रिवेणी धाम
- Location in Nepal

Religion
- Affiliation: Hinduism
- District: Nawalparasi District

Location
- Location: Bardaghat Municipality
- Country: Nepal
- Interactive map of Triveni Dham
- Coordinates: 27.452°N 83.930°E

Triveni Dham (Nepali: त्रिवेणी धाम) is a confluence of three rivers (Triveni Sangam), Sona, Tamasa and Sapta Gandaki. It is located in Binayi Tribeni Rural Municipality, Nawalparasi district of Nepal. The nearby Valmiki Ashram is linked to Ramayana, where Sita was sent to exile by Rama with her two sons Lava and Kusha. The place has many historical temples. Pilgrimages from Nepal and India visit this place for worship and to take holy bath. During Maghe Ausi, a Mela is organized annually. This Mela used to be a common market for Nepali and Indian merchants.

The place is being developed as a tourist site. A new temple with idols of 500 deities was constructed in 2019 at a cost of NPR 25 crore.

== See also ==
- Daunne Devi Temple
- Maula Kalika Temple
- Gandak Hydropower Station, nearby powerstation
