= Gangu Baba =

Indian folk heroes

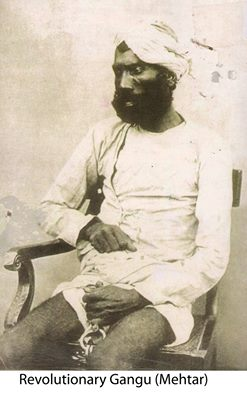
- Gangu Baba just before being hanged on 8th Sept.1859 in Chunniganjh, Kanpur
- Born: Bithoor, Uttar Pradesh, India
- Died: 8 September 1859; Chunniganj, Uttar Pradesh
- Organization: Nana Saheb Peshwa Army ,1857 Mutiny against Britishers
- Movement: Indian Independence movement

Ganga Baba was a participant in Indian Rebellion of 1857. He was born in Bithoor village of Uttar Pradesh.

== Story in oral tradition ==
There are many stories about the bravery and good deeds of Gangu Baba. While he was returning from forest with dead tiger on his back. Nana Saheb Peshwa then the king of Bithoor passed with his army from that place. He saw Gangu Baba with a tiger on his back. He was extremely impressed and asked Gangu Baba to join his army as he already had initiated a battle against Britishers at that time. Gangu Baba readily accepted.

According to oral traditions of Dalits in the villages near Bithoor, he alone killed 150 British soldiers with his sword. This annoyed the Britishers who issued circulars to arrest him dead or alive. Ultimately, he was arrested. The British soldiers tied him to a horse and dragged his body up to Kanpur. Then they hanged him in Chunniganj.

== See also ==
- Matadin Bhangi
