= Chuhra =

Dalit caste in India and Pakistan

- चूहड़ा چُوہْڑا
- Jāti: Dalit
- Gotra: N/A
- Religions: Hinduism, Islam, Christianity and Sikhism
- Country: India, Pakistan and Nepal
- Lineage: Valmiki and Satakarni
- Status: Scheduled Caste category
- Reservation (Education): Yes

Chuhra, also known as Bhanghi and Balmiki, is a Dalit caste in India and Pakistan. Populated regions include the Punjab region of India and Pakistan, as well as Uttar Pradesh in India, among other parts of the Indian subcontinent such as southern India. Their traditional occupation is sweeping, a "polluting" occupation that caused them to be considered untouchables in the caste system.

Originally following the Balmiki sect of Hinduism, many Chuhras converted to Sikhism, Islam and Christianity during the colonial era in India. Today, Chuhras in Indian Punjab are largely followers of Sikhism. A minority continue to follow Hinduism, which incorporates elements of Sikhism in its practices, as well as Christianity. In Pakistani Punjab 90–95% of its Christian population are Dalit Christians of the Chuhra caste; other Chuhras practice Islam or continue to follow Hinduism.

== Etymology ==
The word "Chuhra" is derived from the word "Shudra", one of the varnas in Indian society. Another explanation by Kahn Singh Nabha from his Mahan Kosh is that the term derives from the Prakrit form of the Sanskrit word Chaturhara, meaning "one who removes waste or excreta".

== History ==
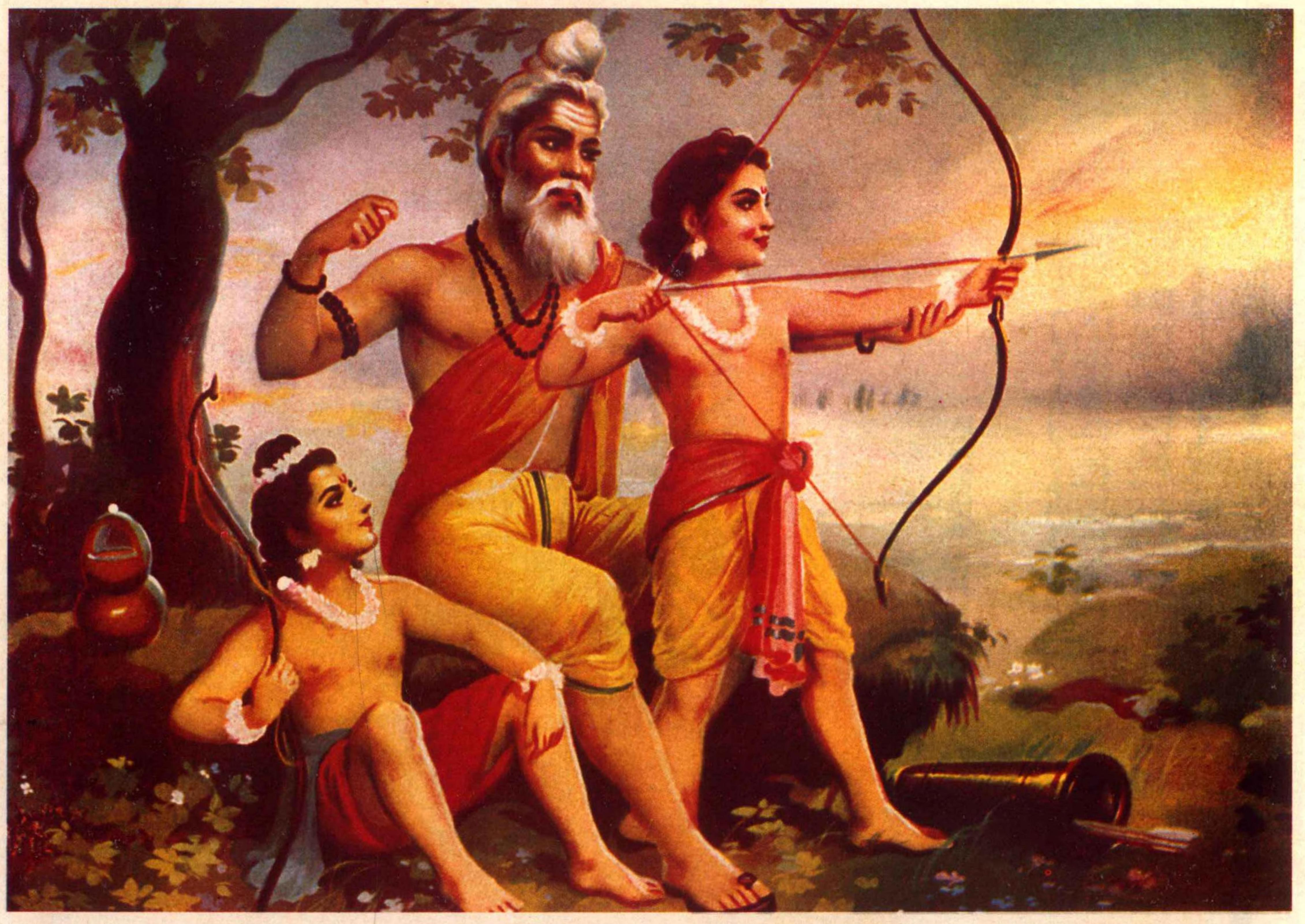
The Chuhras claim descent from Balmiki, composer of the Ramayana.

The Bhangis claim descent from Balmiki (also known as Lal Beg or Balashah), a Brahmin who composed the Ramayana and who is worshipped as a Hindu patron saint by the Bhangis. The word Bhangi is derived from Bhanga which means broken. The Bhangi community claims that they were made to sweep the floor and do other menial jobs when they refused to convert to Islam during the Mughal era.

There are many other different theories of their origin. Some scholars link the institutionalization of "sweeping and scavenging" as a profession in India to the rise of Muslim rule. The need to dispose of waste from secluded defecation areas, particularly for women observing purdah due to a lack of sanitation infrastructure, led to the employment of war captives for cleaning latrines, bucket privies, and removing night-soil. These freed captives, forbidden to integrate into the society, formed a distinct caste known as the Bhangis, who continued manual scavenging. Emperor Akbar later renamed this caste Mehtar(prince or leader), as noted by sociologist Bindeshwar Pathak in his 1999 work, Road to Freedom: A Sociological Study on Abolition of Scavenging in India. Another theory suggests the name "Mehtar" comes from the Sanskrit word "Meh," meaning "saturated." This connection is seen as fitting due to the caste's historical work with "night soil." (Sharma 1995). Some link it to the consumption of "bhang" (hemp), while others apply this derivation only to those scavengers who also worked with bamboo. Crooke (1896) and Zilliot (1970) connect the term to Sanskrit "Bhang" and a perceived drunken habit, but Mishra (1936) rejects this theory. The 1960 Malkani Committee noted that even untouchable Hindu castes who converted to Islam continued scavenging. Writer Gita Ramaswamy argues the view of the relation with Islam aligns with Hindutva narratives that blame Muslim rule for social ills, without acknowledging the pervasive role of caste in India.

Originally following the Balmiki sect of Hinduism, many Chuhras converted to Sikhism, Islam and Christianity during the colonial era in India. The faith practiced by the Lal Begi Chuhras came to syncretize elements of Hinduism, Islam and Christianity. The Arya Samaj drew the majority to mainstream Hinduism while conversions similarly happened to Islam, Christianity, and Sikhism in the 19th and early 20th centuries.

In 1932 in colonial India, the Balmiki Sabha was created to advocate for the rights of the Chuhras. The Balmiki Sabha was applauded by the Indian National Congress in the mid-1940s for heralding its political message among the Chuhras.

== Balmiki caste ==
The Balmikis are a variety of communities throughout India who all claim descent from the legendary author of the Ramayana, Valmiki. The Balmikis can be classified as an ethnic group, caste or sampradaya (tradition/sect). Valkimis from Odisha and Andhra Pradesh natively speak the Kupia language.

In the north-west Punjab region, this caste had adopted Sikhism. During the Indian Rebellion of 1857, many Balmiki were prominent rebels. Notable examples include Matadin Bhangi, Gangu Mehtar and Bhura Singh Balmiki. Members of this caste are now inclined towards politics and government high positions.

According to the 2001 Census of India, the Balmikis formed 11.2 per cent of the Scheduled Caste population in the Indian state of Punjab and were the second-most populous Scheduled Caste in Delhi National Capital Region. The 2011 Census of India for Uttar Pradesh showed the Balmiki population, which was classified as a Scheduled Caste, as 1,319,241.

In the UK, the Council of Balmiki Sabhas UK claims to represent the Balmiki.

== By religion ==
=== In Hinduism ===
As with the Lal Begi, the majority of Hindu Chuhras belong to the Balmiki sect of Hinduism. In the Baluchistan Province of colonial India, the majority of Chuhras in the 1931 Indian Census thus recorded themselves as "Hindu Balmiki".

=== In Christianity ===
In colonial India, there were waves of conversions to Christianity among the Chuhra and Chamar between the 1870s and 1930s in the Punjab Province and United Provinces of Agra and Oudh. The censuses of British India became increasingly confused regarding Chuhra Dalits' religious beliefs because the respondents were allowed to choose their designation. Jeffrey Cox says that in the 1920s and 1930s they described themselves variously as

Chuhra, "Hindu" Chuhra, Musali (Muslim Chuhra), Mazhabi (Sikh Chuhra), Ad-Dharmi, Christian Chuhra, or simply Christian ... It is certain that a large majority of the 391,270 Indian Christians enumerated in Punjab were Chuhras – that is, the most stigmatized minority in the province.

In what is now Pakistan, the conversions to Christianity and consequent invention of a new identity were largely responsible for the name Chuhra becoming archaic. It is often considered pejorative and applied to almost all of the Christians in the country, whom John O'Brien describes as "descended from one tribe-caste of oppressed and excluded people". The status of the Christian Chuhra as Dalit Christians continues to be "distinct feature of social discrimination" against them.

=== In Islam ===
Chuhras who converted from Hinduism to Islam were known as Musalis. Despite placing great emphasis on social equality and brotherhood among all Muslims, early South Asian Muslims did not address the problem of untouchability for the Chuhras or Bhangis. As a result, only a very few members from this community ever embraced Islam, most converting to Christianity. Chuhras adopted the externals of Islam by keeping Muslim names, observing Ramadan and burial of the dead. However, they never underwent circumcision. Only a few cases of circumcision have ever been recorded for Chuhras or Bhangis and these were Chuhras who lived very near the jama masjid (congregational mosque). The Chuhras did not accept Mohammed as their prophet and also continued observing traditional Hindu festivals, such as Diwali, Rakhi and Holi. Just like their Hindu brethren they continued with their traditional caste work. In India the caste system was fully observed by Muslims. In the same way that Hindu Chuhras who were barred from entrance to temples in historical times, Muslim Chuhras are still today barred from entrance to mosques and never allowed to go past the outside steps to Muslim religious places. The Untouchability even extended after death; Chuhras were to bury their dead in separate graveyards away from other Muslims.

=== In Sikhism ===
Chuhras who converted from Hinduism to Sikhism became known as Mazhabi Sikhs.

== Demographics ==
According to the 2001 Census of India, the Balmikis formed 11.2 per cent of the Scheduled Caste population in Punjab and were the second-most populous Scheduled Caste in Delhi National Capital Region.

The 2011 Census of India for Uttar Pradesh showed the Balmiki population, which was classified as a Scheduled Caste, as 1,319,241.

The Balmikis represent 0.08 per cent in Andhra Pradesh and are mainly concentrated in Anantapur, Kurnool and Kadapa districts of Andhra Pradesh. They also built a temple of Balmiki in Anantapur, Andhra Pradesh.

In the UK, the Council of Balmiki Sabhas UK was established to represent the Balmiki.

State, U.T	Population	Population %	Notes
Andhra Pradesh	70,513	0.083%	In the Joint State of Andhara Pradesh during the 2011 census, the Balmiki caste had been counted as a Scheduled Tribe instead of a Scheduled Caste.
Bihar	207,549	0.199%	Counted as Hari, Mehtar, Bhangi
Chandigarh	82,624	7.82%	Counted as Mazhabi, Balmiki, Chura or Bhangi
Chhattisgarh	19,016	0.074%	Counted as Bhangi, Mehtar, Balmiki, Lalbegi, Dharkar
NCT of Delhi	577,281	3.43%	Counted as Chuhra (Balmiki)
Goa	309	0.0%	Counted as Bhangi (Hadi)
Gujarat	439,444	0.72%	Counted as Bhangi, Mehtar, Olgana, Rukhi, Malkana, Halalkhor, Lalbegi, Balmiki, Korar, Zadmalli, Barwashia, Barwasia, Jamphoda, Zampada, Zampda, Rushi, Balmiki
Haryana	1,079,682	4.25%	Counted as Balmiki, Chura, Bhangi, Mazhabi and Mazhabi Sikh
Himachal Pradesh	35,150	0.51%	Counted as Balmiki, Bhangi, Chuhra, Chura, Chuhre and Mazhabi
Jammu & Kashmir	6918	0.0%	Counted as Chura, Bhangi, Balmiki, Mehtar
Jharkhand	58,242	0.17%	Counted as Hari, Mehtar, Bhangi
Karnataka	5,281	0.0086%	Counted as Bhangi, Mehtar, Olgana, Rukhi, Malkana, Halalkhor, Lalbegi, Balmiki, Korar, Zadmalli
Madhya Pradesh	365,769	0.5%	Counted as Bhangi, Mehtar, Balmik, Lalbegi, Dharkar
Maharashtra	217,166	0.19%	Counted as Bhangi, Mehtar, Olgana, Rukhi, Malkana, Halalkhor, Lalbegi, Balmiki, Korar, Zadmalli, Hela
Mizoram	21	0.0%	Counted as Mehtar, Bhangi
Odisha	2,453	0.0%	Counted as Hari, Mehtar, Bhangi
Punjab	3,500,874	12.61%	Counted as Mazhabi, Mazhabi Sikh, Balmiki, Chuhra, Bhangi
Rajasthan	625,011	0.91%	Counted as Majhabi, Bhangi, Chura, Mehtar, Olgana, Rukhi, Malkana, Halalkhor, Lalbegi, Balmiki, Balmiki, Korar, Zadmalli
Tripura	1,851	0.0%	Counted as Mehtor
Uttarakhand	118,421	1.17%	Counted as Mazhabi and Balmiki
Uttar Pradesh	1,319,241	0.66%	Counted as Balmiki
West Bengal	431,257	0.47%	Counted as Hari, Mehtar, Mehtor, Bhangi, Balmiki

== Sub-castes ==
The following are sub-castes of the Balmiki/Bhangi/Chuhra caste:

- Borat
- Bhatti
- Chhapriband
- Dharival
- Gill
- Hansi
- Kandabari
- Khosar
- Ladhar
- Lal Begi
- Mattu
- Sahotra/Sotra
- Sindhu
- Untwal
- Balmikis

== Use as an epithet ==
The locution "Chuhra-Chamar" is used derisively by jatt caste to refer to both Dalit castes, the Chuhra and Chamar.

== See also ==
- Mazhabi Sikh
- Balmiki
- Dalit theology
- Matadin Bhangi
- Madakari Nayaka
- Bhai Jiwan Singh
- Bhura Singh Balmiki
- Gangu Baba
- Sikh Light Infantry
- Bhagwan Balmiki Tirath Sthal
- Balmikism
- Balmiki Ashram
