= Oriental Orthodoxy in India =

Oriental Orthodoxy in India is a minority and a subsection of Christians in India. Oriental Orthodoxy in India is traditionally traced to the apostolic mission of St. Thomas the Apostle in the 1st century, who is believed to have established early Christian communities along the Malabar Coast. These Saint Thomas Christians later developed connections with the Syriac Orthodox Church of Antioch. The Malankara Syriac Orthodox Church continues as an integral part of the Syriac Orthodox Church. The Malankara Orthodox Syrian Church forms an independent church that developed in the Syriac Orthodox tradition. Both are centered in Kerala and retain the West Syriac liturgical heritage. However, the churches have been locked in a century-old dispute over governance and church properties in Kerala.

In addition, the Armenian Apostolic Church established a presence in India through merchant communities in cities such as Kolkata and Chennai, contributing to the broader Oriental Orthodox presence in the country. Together, around 3.7 million Oriental Orthodox Christians live in India, mainly in Kerala, making up a substantial minority of Kerala’s population.

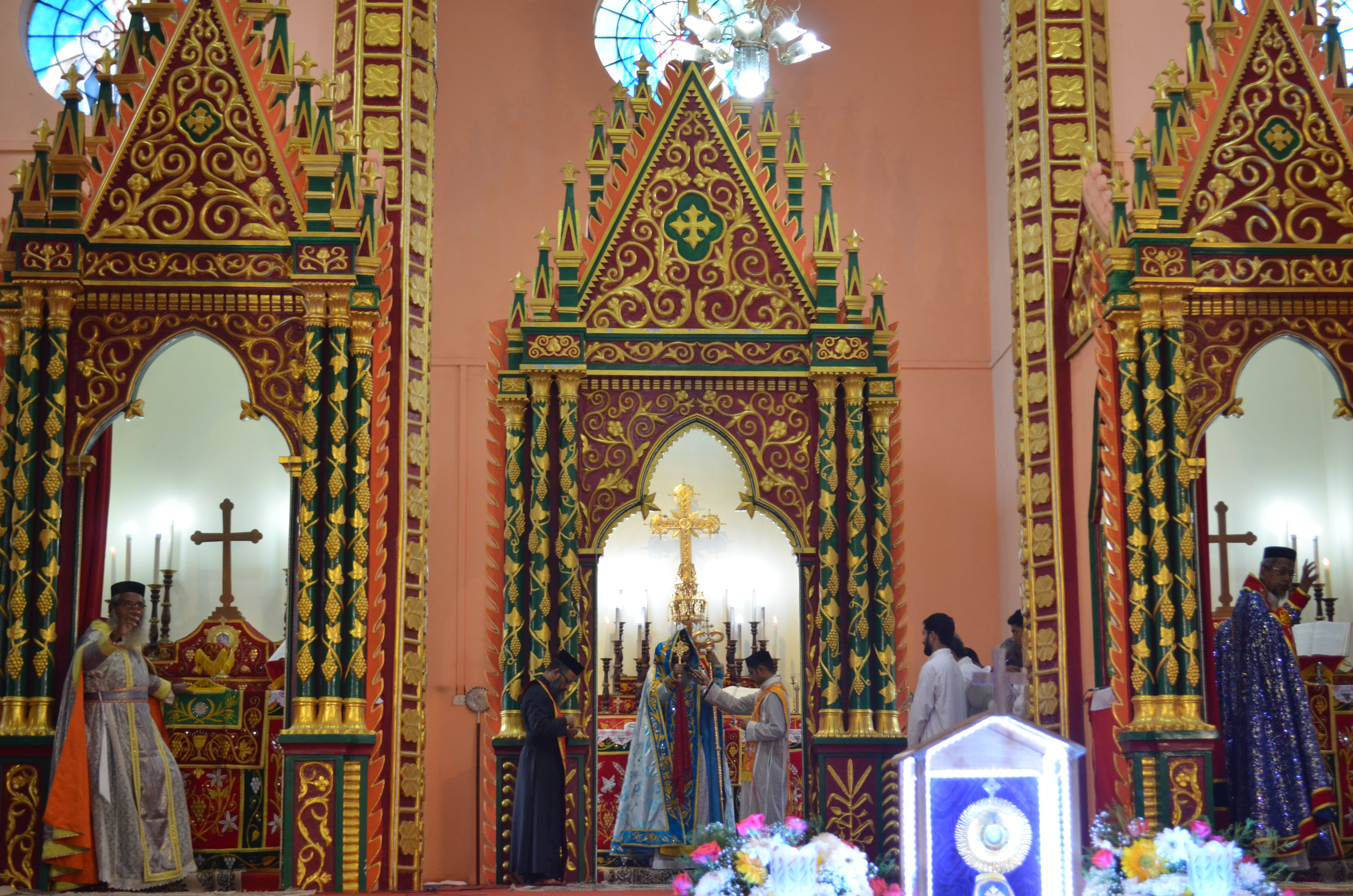
Litugury of the Jacobite Syrian Christian Church

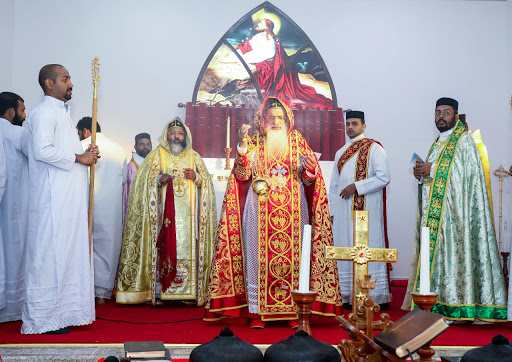
Eucharist celebration of the Malankara Orthodox Syrian Church

== See also ==
- Jacobite Syrian Christian Church
- Malankara Orthodox Syrian Church
- Christianity in Kerala
- Roman Catholicism in India
- Protestantism in India
