= Balmikism =

Vaishnava Hindu sect

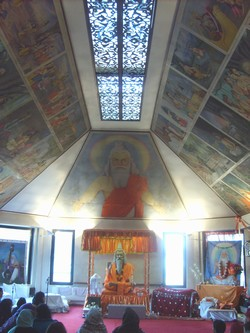
A Valmiki ashram in Southall, United Kingdom

Balmikism or Valmikism is a Hindu sect that reveres the sage Valmiki (also known as Bala Shah or Lal Beg) as an ancestor and patron saint. Followers hold that Valmiki was an avatar of God and regard his works, the Ramayana and the Yoga Vasistha, as their holy scripture. Balmiki is traditionally depicted wearing red clothing, which accounts for the epithet Lal Bhekh (meaning "red-garbed"), sometimes rendered as Lal Beg.

Valmiki mandirs (temples) are open to all. The most widely observed festival among Valmiki Hindus is Valmiki Jayanti, also known as Pargat Diwas, which is celebrated on the full moon of the Hindu month of Ashvin and marks the birth anniversary of Valmiki. Many worshippers at Valmiki temples are Dalits, especially those belonging to the Chuhra community, though adherents from other castes also attend and patrons of Valmiki temples come from diverse backgrounds.

In 2016, the Bhagwan Valmiki Tirath Sthal in Amritsar, formerly known as Ram Tirath, was renamed and a large statue of Valmiki was installed at the site following a campaign by members of the Valmiki community.
