= Jabour (name) =

Jabour or Jabbour is an Arabic surname (more seldom a given name), also transliterated Jabbur and Jabur. Notable people with the name include:

== Jabour, surname ==
- Anya Jabour, American historian
- Julia Jabour, Antarctic legal researcher
- Lenni Jabour (born 1970), Canadian singer-songwriter
- Marwan Jabour (born 1977), a former captive held in the CIA's network of black sites
- Paul Jabour (born 1956), American politician

== Jabbour, surname ==
- Alan Jabbour (1942–2017), American musician and folklorist
- Brahim Jabbour (born 1970), Moroccan long-distance runner
- Emily Jabbour, American politician
- Gabriel Jabbour (1922–1987), French actor
- Kamal Jabbour (born 1957), US Air Force Senior Scientist for Information Assurance
- Nabeel Jabbour (born 1941), American academic and writer
- Zeke Jabbour, American bridge player

== Jabbour, given name ==
- Jabbour Douaihy (1949–2021), Lebanese writer

== See also ==
- Jabour (region) of Rio de Janeiro city, named after Lebanese immigrant Abrahão Jabour
- Jabor (disambiguation)
- Places in Malaysia named Jabur or Jabor
  - Hulu Jabur, a subdivision of Kemaman District, Malaysia
  - Jabur Kubur or Jabor Kubur, village in Chukai town, Terengganu state, eastern Malaysia
- Jubur, Iraqi Arab tribe
