= Senador Camará =

- Neighborhood
- Location in Rio de Janeiro Senador Camará (Brazil)
- Coordinates: 22°54′16″S 43°29′30″W
- Country: Brazil
- State: Rio de Janeiro (RJ)
- Municipality/City: Rio de Janeiro
- Zone: West Zone

Senador Camará is a populous neighborhood in the West Zone of Rio de Janeiro, Brazil, with 111.231 residents (according to information of the Instituto Brasileiro de Geografia e Estatística - IBGE- Demographic Census of 2000) distributed in an area of 1,723.59 hectares, of lower class. It borders the neighborhoods of Bangu and Santíssimo.

The name originated from the railroad station that attends the neighborhood and is named "Estação Senador Camará" (Senador Camará Station in English), in honor of the Senator Otacílio de Carvalho Camará, that was the Senator of the Republic in 1919 and 1920.

The neighborhood is divided by the railway of the extension line of Santa Cruz, nowadays operated by the company SuperVia. On the left of the railway, on the direction to Santa Cruz, the neighborhood is cut by the Santa Cruz Avenue, that connects the neighborhoods of Realengo and Santa Cruz. On the right side, the neighborhood is cut by the Taquaral Roadway, that starts and finishes on the neighborhood of Senador Camará.

Located within Senador Camará is the enclave of Jabour.
