= Kentucky Historical Society =

Agency of Kentucky government

The Kentucky Historical Society (KHS) is an agency of the Kentucky state government that records and preserves important historical documents, buildings, and artifacts of Kentucky's past. It was originally established in 1836 as a private organization. The KHS history campus, located in downtown Frankfort, Kentucky, includes the Thomas D. Clark Center for Kentucky History, the Old State Capitol, and the Kentucky Military History Museum at the State Arsenal. KHS is a part of the Kentucky Tourism-Arts and Heritage Cabinet, is fully accredited by the American Alliance of Museums, is a Smithsonian affiliate, and endorses the History Relevance statement. The mission of the KHS is to educate and engage the public through Kentucky's history in order to confront the challenges of the future. The KHS allows the public access to their resources through the online Library catalog along with the in-person Library.

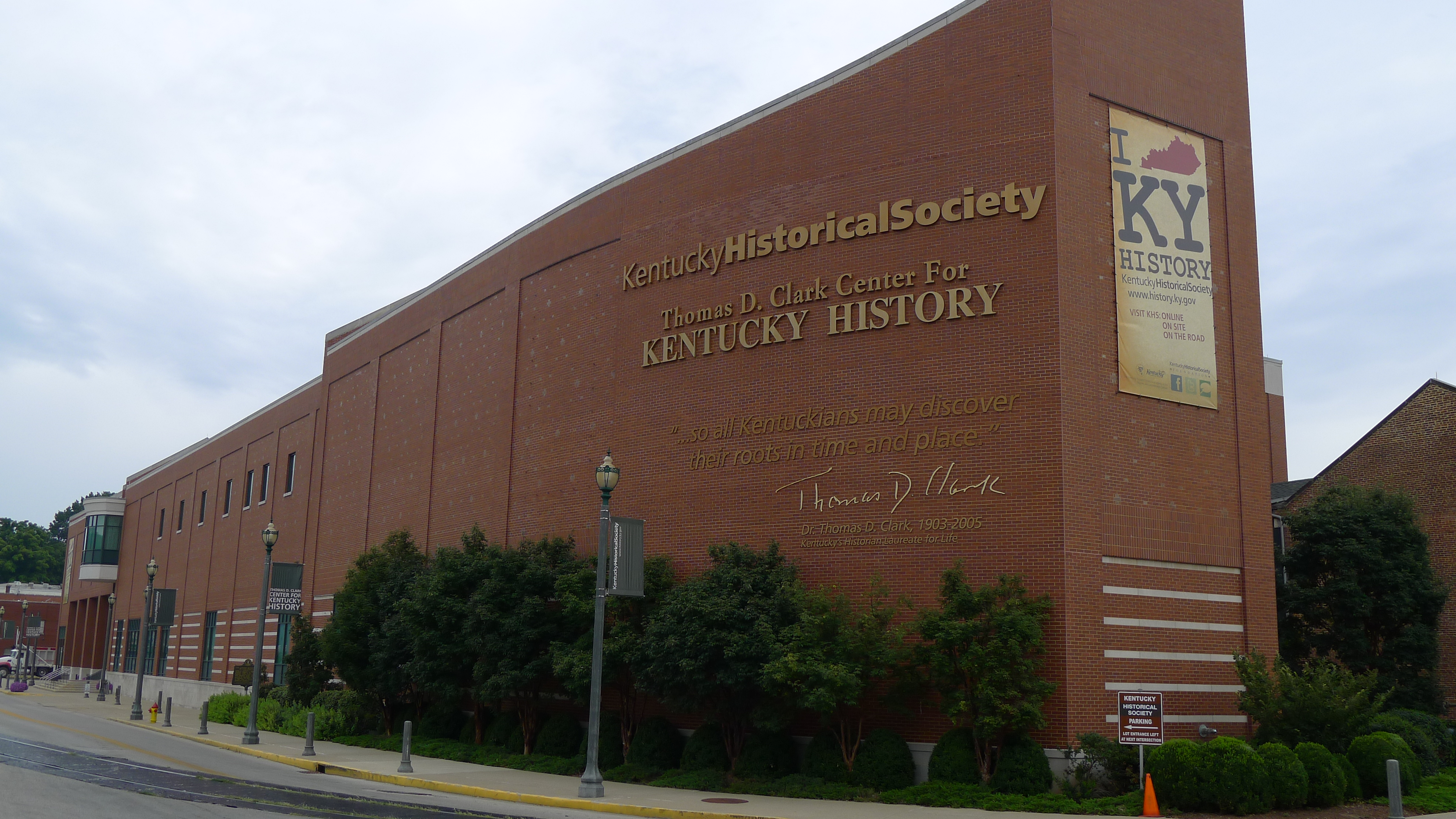
The facade of the Thomas D. Clark Center for Kentucky History

== Thomas D. Clark Center for Kentucky History ==
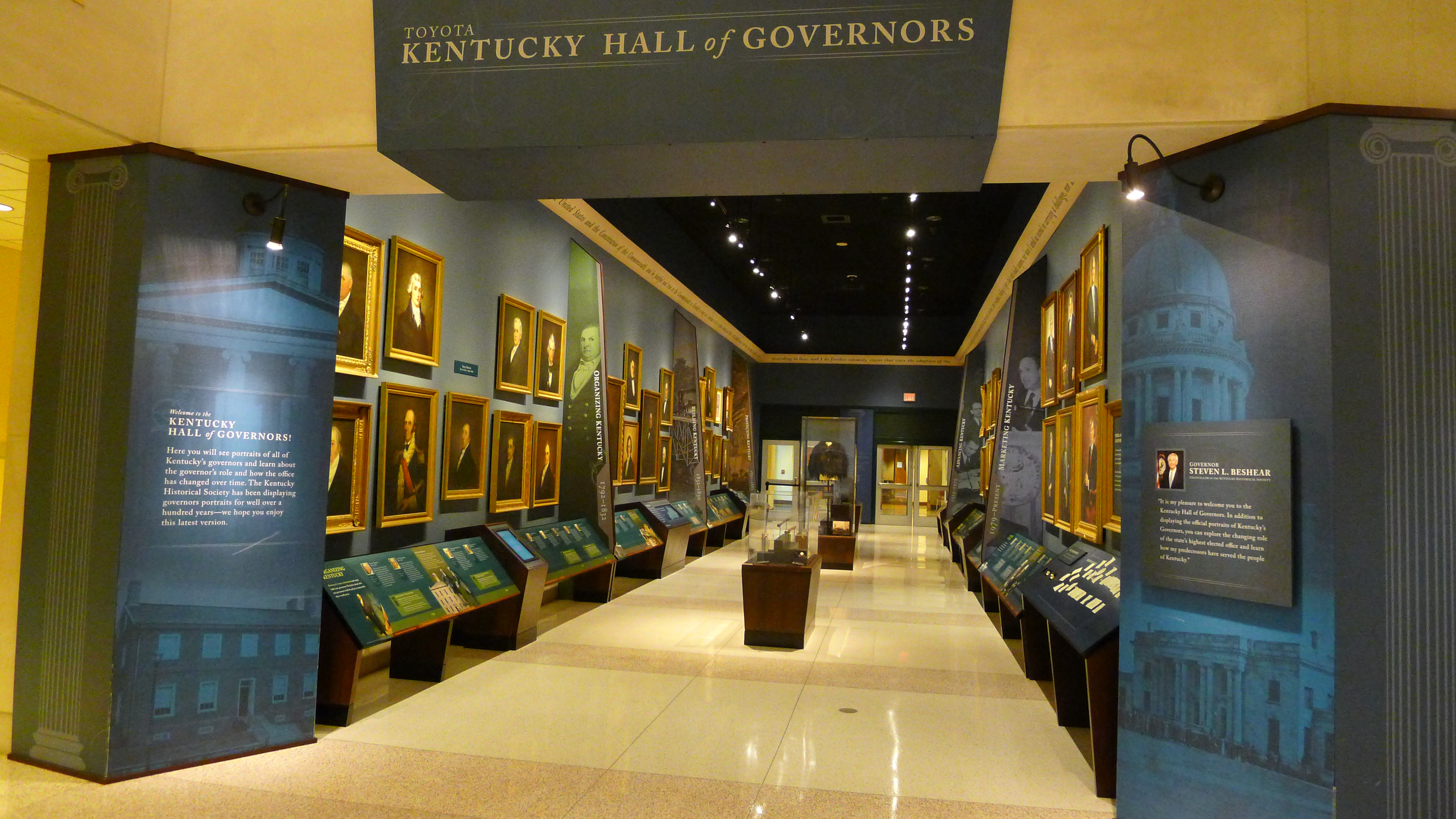
The Kentucky Hall of Governors in the Thomas D. Clark Center for Kentucky History

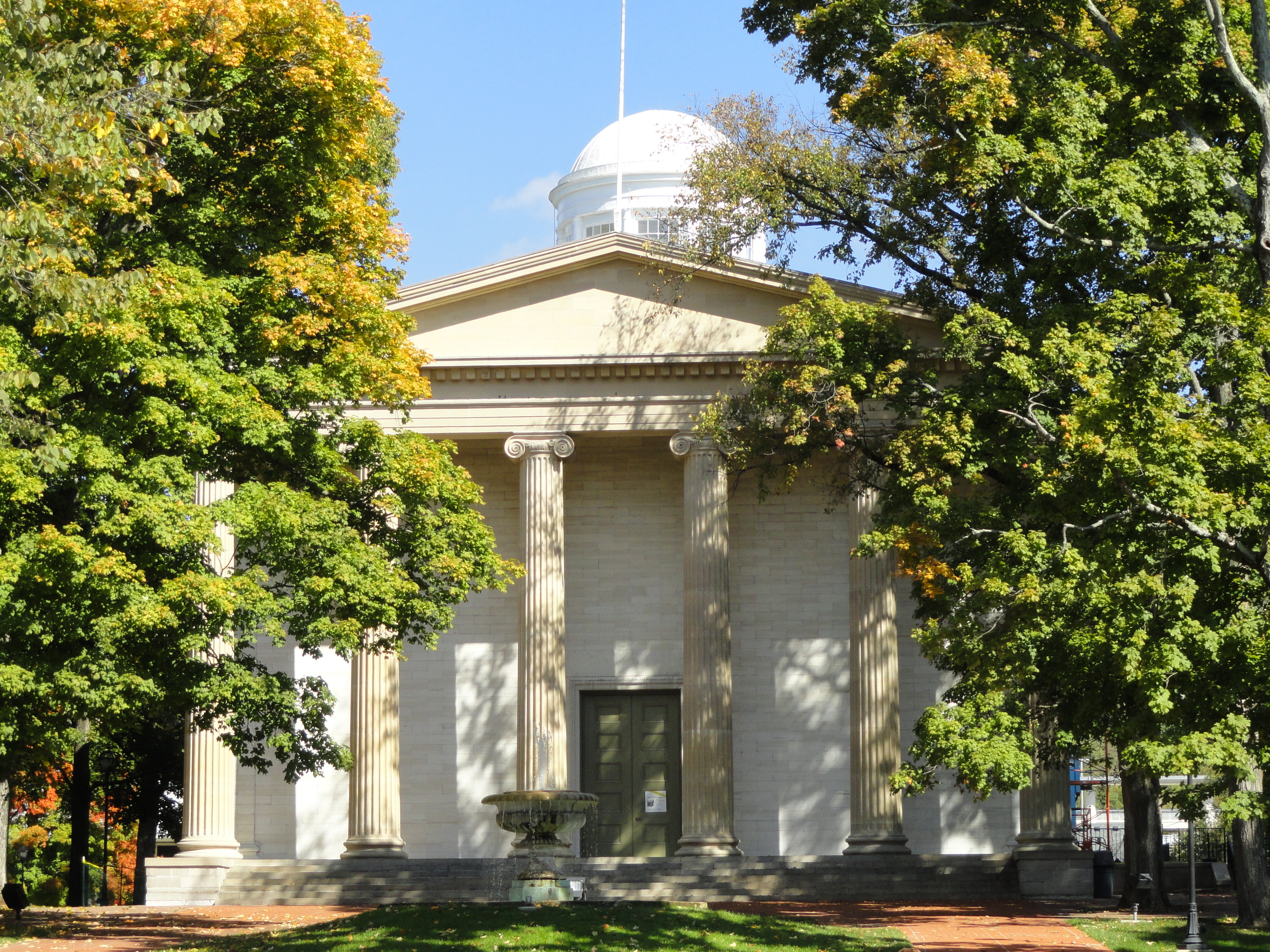
Kentucky's Old State Capitol Building

The Thomas D. Clark Center for Kentucky History, also referred to as the Kentucky Historical Society, is the headquarters for the KHS. A multimillion-dollar museum and research facility, the center features both permanent and temporary exhibitions, a research library, and a gift shop.

The center contains an exhibition called "A Kentucky Journey" that covers the period from prehistoric times to the present. The center also contains the Martin F. Schmidt Research Library. The Library is a genealogical and historical research library, researchers can access books, manuscripts, graphic collections, and oral histories documenting the people and places of Kentucky's rich past. Families and historians can trace back genealogies and consult with professional staff. Along with that, it also contains the Keeneland Changing Exhibits Gallery for various temporary exhibitions – some examples of which include "Beyond the Log Cabin: Kentucky's Abraham Lincoln" and "Made to be Played: Traditional Art of Kentucky Luthiers." Within the center there is a gift shop, the gift shop is called the Stewart Home & School 1792 Museum Store.

== Old State Capitol ==
The Old State Capitol & Public Grounds, a National Historic Landmark, served as Kentucky's capital from 1830 to 1910 and was the setting for lively political debates as lawmakers grappled with such issues of the day as slavery and war. Today it is restored to the way it looked in the early 1850s and contains pieces original to that time. A young Gideon Shryock, the state's first native-born professionally trained architect, designed this Greek Revival building. It is the third one to have served as Kentucky's seat of government.

The Old State Capitol was not the only place to have held the KHS. The Society began in 1836 by some of Kentucky's prominent young men. The men received funding from the General Assembly to begin the society and lead it into the future. The society met from 1836 until 1889, but after that time, the society did not meet for seven years. With the revival of the society in 1896, it brought their new location at the Old State Capitol. That location was only the site of the KHS for a few years as it became clear to the Society that their collections were too large for that space. With the need for more space that the Old State Capitol could not provide, the new construction of the Kentucky Historical Center opened to the public in 1999. Today the Old State Capitol is still a part of the KHS but is displayed as a museum of past government debates.

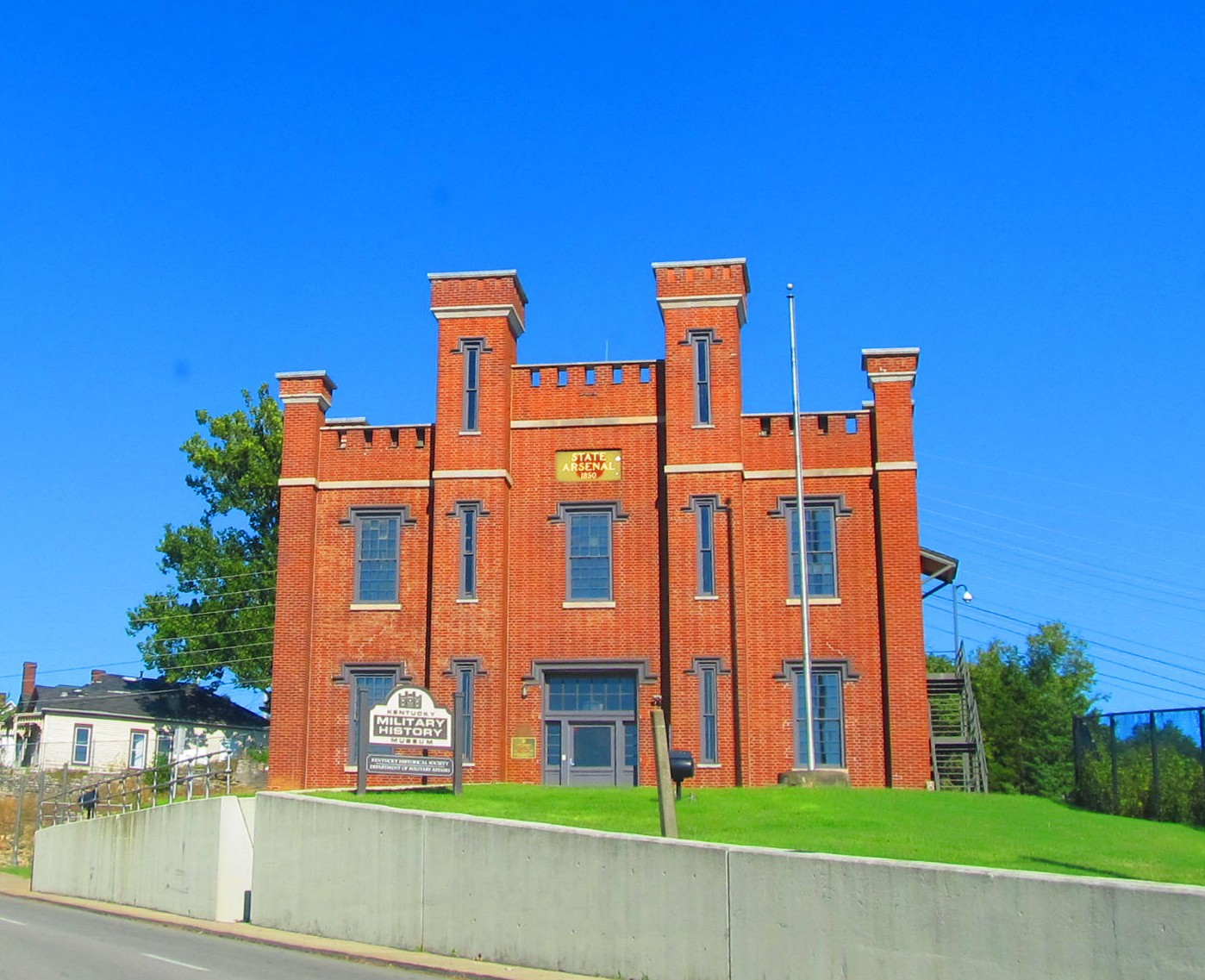
Kentucky Military History Museum. Previously the Kentucky State Arsenal

== Kentucky Military History Museum ==
Built in 1850, the State Arsenal contains the Kentucky Military History Museum, which illustrates military history using personal stories and artifacts; the first location of the State Arsenal burnt down in 1836. It is a fortress-like building that overlooks downtown Frankfort. The Arsenal was converted into a museum in 1974 after contributing much to the Civil War and the National Guard. The State Arsenal has been recently renovated. The museum is also a member of the Army Museum System.

== Martin F. Schmidt Research Library ==
Located on the second floor of the Thomas D. Clark Center for Kentucky History, the Martin F. Schmidt Research Library holds the largest genealogical collection in the state. This research facility features more than 16,000 rolls of microfilm, 90,000 books and periodicals, and 30,000 vertical files focused primarily on Kentucky history and genealogy. The Society's Archival Collections of 1,900 cubic feet of manuscripts, 2,000 maps, 8,000 oral histories, 200,000 historic photographs, and 9,100 rare books provide resources to researchers of the Commonwealth. The Library is available to the public online through the KHS digital search website and there is also in-person access to the documents and articles that the society contains. The Register is a part of this catalog and this digital version makes it and all of the other resources that the Library contains, very accessible.

== The Register ==
The Register is a scholarly journal published by the KHS. It was first published in 1903 and has been continuously posted since then. The articles contain documents and information about Kentucky's history. It is relevant to the history of Kentucky but also includes major global events. Jennie Chinn Molton founded the Register and became the Register’s first editor. Since then, many people have been able to edit the Register; today's editors include Karida Brown, Anya Jabour, Joseph Pearson, and Fay Yarbrough. All of the articles are available to the public. The Register includes the work of leading scholars in the Commonwealth while also being widely accessible to general readers. Articles of The Register are available through scholarly publishers Project Muse and JSTOR.

== Other information ==
Members of the public can purchase memberships to the Kentucky Historical Society. The memberships purchased support the efforts of the KHS and give members the benefit of free admission to the history campus and reduced admission prices to KHS events and programs. The KHS is administered by an executive committee and supported by the KHS Foundation, a 501(c)(3) organization (nonprofit). There are also options to visit the society in a guided group tour, self-guided touring, or virtual touring. Prices range from $5 to $75 depending on the type of tour chosen. The KHS is home to the major digital humanities project, the Civil War Governors of Kentucky Digital Documentary Edition (CWGK). Funded in part by the National Endowment for the Humanities and the National Historical Publications and Records Commission, the CWGK is a "freely-accessible online collection of historical documents associated with the chief executives of the state, 1860–1865" that seeks to reconstruct "the lost lives and voices of tens of thousands of Kentuckians who interacted with the office of the governor during the war years" through some 40,000 related documents. After an early access version was published, the work of the CWGK was celebrated in a June 2017 symposium that featured a keynote by renowned historian and digital humanist Edward L. Ayers. Later that same year, in August 2017, the CWGK's annotation tech was featured at the international Digital Humanities 2017 conference in Montreal, Canada.

The KHS has a variety of facilities available for rent, including the Commonwealth Hall, conference rooms, and the Cralle-Day Garden. There are seven different places in total that the Society provides for renting. The places could be rented for small or large occasions.

== See also ==
- List of historical societies in Kentucky
