= St. Thomas Evangelical Church of India =

Eastern Oriental Protestant episcopal denomination

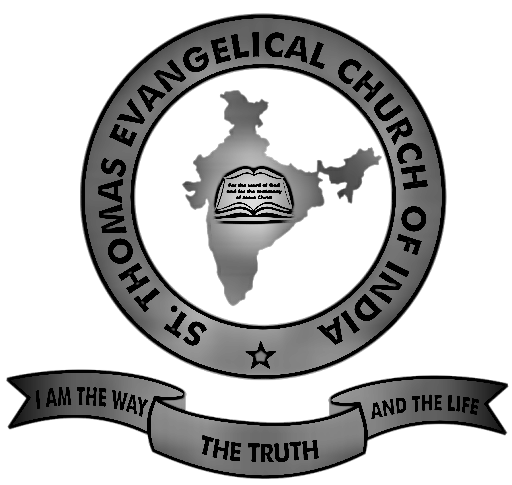
- St Thomas Evangelical Church Of India Emblem
- Abbreviation: STECI
- Type: Eastern Protestant
- Classification: Syrian Christian, Saint Thomas Syrian Christians
- Scripture: Holy Bible
- Polity: Episcopal
- Governance: Democratic
- Presiding Bishop: Most Rev Dr Abraham Chacko
- Language: Malayalam, English, Hindi, Odia, Tamil, Kannada, Marathi, Gujrati, Telugu,
- Liturgy: West Syriac Rite (Reformed)
- Headquarters: Manjadi, Thiruvalla Kerala, India
- Territory: Universal
- Possessions: India, United States, Canada, Europe, Great Britain-London & Belfast, Middle East, Singapore
- Origin: 26 January 1961; Thaimala, Thiruvalla
- Independence: 1961
- Recognition: Independent Episcopal Church, 1961
- Separated from: Malankara Mar Thoma Syrian Church (1961)
- Congregations: 350+
- Members: 100,000+
- Ministers: Bishops- 6, Clergy- 150+
- Missionaries: 400+
- Publications: suvisesha prakasini
- Official website: http://steci.org/
- Slogan: FOR THE WORD OF GOD AND FOR THE TESTIMONY OF JESUS CHRIST (REV. 1:9)

St. Thomas Evangelical Church of India (STECI) is an Oriental Protestant denomination based in Kerala, India. The church originated from a schism in the Malankara Mar Thoma Syrian Church in 1961 and forms a part of the Saint Thomas Syrian Christian community. The headquarters of the church is at Tiruvalla, Kerala.

== History ==
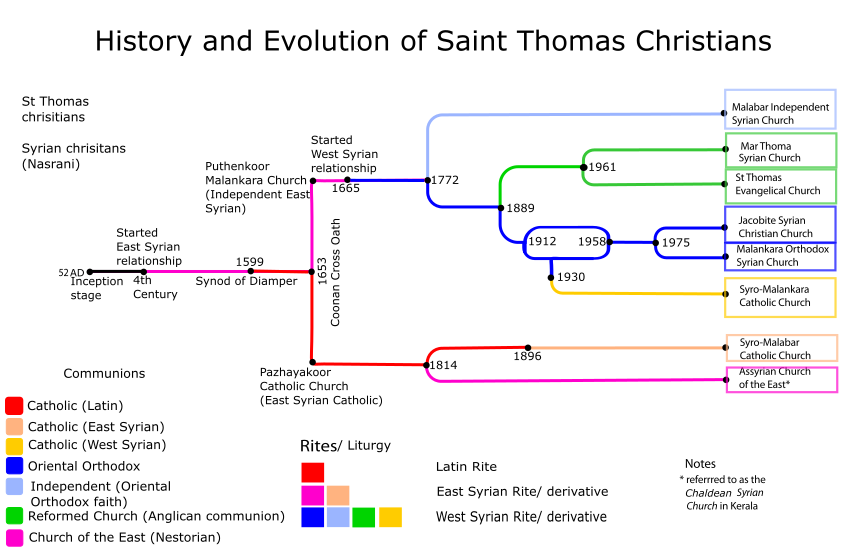
Branches & Denominations of Saint Thomas Christians

The St. Thomas Evangelical Church is one of several groups of Saint Thomas Christians who trace their origins to Thomas the Apostle who, according to their tradition, came to India in AD 52.

Until 1961, the church's history was deeply connected to the Malankara Mar Thoma Syrian Church, the first Reformed denomination of the Malankara Church (Saint Thomas Christians who trace their origins to the communities and churches founded by Thomas the Apostle and who later rejected Portuguese latinization).

In the 1800s, South Indian Christians were in contact with British missionaries during the time of British colonialism. The missionaries facilitated the translation of the Bible into Malayalam in 1811; this was the first vernacular Bible in Kerala. Further changes introduced by the influence of missionaries led to a schism among the Saint homas Christians.

By the 1830s, some clergy in the Malankara Church, notably Abraham Malpan, were looking at reform, particularly in the area of rituals and liturgical practices. This movement led to the establishment of the Mar Thoma Evangelistic Association (MTEA) in 1888. A downstream effect of these reforms was the formation of the Mar Thoma Syrian Church.

The formal reform movement that led to the formation of STECI traces its roots to Palakkunnath Abraham Malpan (1796–1845), a key figure in the 19th-century Malankara Church who initiated significant reforms aimed at restoring biblical purity. Malpan fundamentally sought to restore the Malankara Church to its original pre-Synod of Diamper nature, purging it of what he perceived as inventions introduced through latinization (Roman Catholic influence introduced to the St. Thomas Christians by the Portuguese). To this end, Malpan rejected practices he considered unbiblical, including prayers for the dead, veneration of saints, use of icons and statues, veneration of sacraments, auricular confession, and certain other observed rituals. He promoted vernacular worship and emphasized scriptural preaching.

By the mid-20th century some members within the Mar Thoma Syrian Church felt the church was gradually moving away from its original strict evangelical vision. Key areas of divergence included the church’s retention of baby baptism that opposed confessional baptism, use of rituals (incense and other ceremonial elements), and an emphasis on tradition. Concerned about these developments, reform-minded members sought to restore biblically grounded ideals, which they viewed as representing the original theology of the Mar Thoma Syrian Church as ushered in by Abraham Malpan.

Subsequently, in 1952 some members and clergy, responding to these theological divergences, established the Mar Thoma Pathiopadesa Samathy (St. Thomas Organisation for Sound Doctrine). In 1960, four presbyters (P John Varghese, P I Mathal, CM Vaghese and KO John) were suspended. This led to the establishment of the St. Thomas Evangelical Church of India (STECI), on January 26, 1961, with 20 ministers and 25,000 lay Christians.

STECI established the Jubilee Memorial Bible College in Chennai in August 1987. The college trains students who come from different denominations, in addition to the candidates from the STECI, and has links to the Biblical Graduate School of Theology in Singapore and Columbia International University in the US.

In line with the vision of caring for people who go through sickness and suffering, the church started a care home named Shalom Bhavan on February 9,2016, to provide a place of rest, comfort and hope for patients coming for treatments in Vellore Christian Medical College (CMC Vellore).

== Beliefs ==
=== Mission statement ===
STECI was formed with a three-pronged mission;

- Safeguarding sound doctrine
- Living a holy life
- Obeying the Great Commission to evangelise India

=== Basic teachings ===
STECI believes in; the Trinity, the second coming, sola scriptura of 66 books of the Bible, salvation by faith (not works), safeguarding sound doctrine, evangelism and sharing the news about Jesus, royal priesthood and prayers to Jesus for the living. STECI affirms the original text of the Nicene Creed as its core statement of doctrine (following a reformed West Syriac liturgical rite, it does not affirm the filioque).

=== Sacraments ===
STECI members incorporate two sacraments into their lives; these are baptism and the Lord’s Supper.

== Bishops ==
- Bishop Most Rev. Dr. Abraham Chacko
- Bishop Dr. Thomas Abraham (Retd.)
- Bishop Dr. T. C. Cherian (Retd.)
- Bishop Dr. M. K. Koshy (Retd.)
- Bishop A. I. Alexander (Retd.)
- Bishop Dr. C.V. Mathew (Retd.)

== Late Bishops ==
- Bishop P. John Varghese
- Bishop K. N. Oommen
- Bishop P. S. Varghese

== Dioceses ==
In 2023, the church has seven dioceses. Four of these are in Kerala; the others are "Bahya Kerala" ‘’Gulf and Singapore’’ and ‘’North America and Europe’’. The dioceses cover 240 parishes.

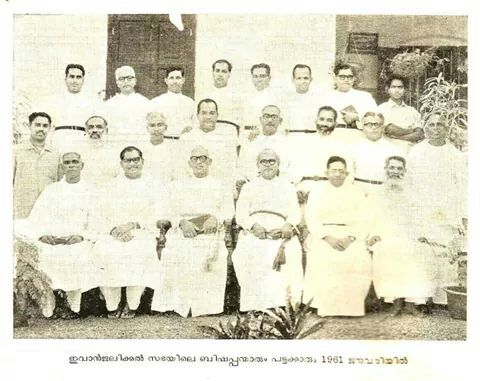
Clergy in 196

== STECI Boards ==
- Board of Evangelistic Work
- Board of Youths
- Board of Women
- Board of Sunday School
- Board of Education
- Department of Music & Communications

== STECI Organizations ==
- Jubilee Memorial Bible College, Chennai
- Shalom Bhavan, Vellore
- Shradha Palliative Care
- Prakasapuram Ashram

== See also ==
- P. T. Chandapilla
