= Jabor =

Jabor may refer to:

== Personal names ==
Family name

- Arnaldo Jabor (1940–2022), Brazilian film-maker
- Baqir Jabr al-Zubeidi (born 1946), sometimes known as Bayan Jabor, Iraqi politician
- Carolina Jabor (born 1975), Brazilian director and producer
- Najla Jabor (1915–2001), Brazilian composer

Given name

- Jabor Al-Mutawa (born 1994), Qatari tennis professional

Fictional characters

- a djinni in the Bartimaeus Sequence novels by Jonathan Stroud

== Places ==
- Jabor (Marshall Islands)
- Jabor/Jabur Kubur, village in Chukai town, Terengganu, Malaysia

== See also ==
- Jabour (name), incl. Jabbour
