= Solomon Adeniyi Babalola =

Nigerian Baptist pastor (1929–2021)

Solomon Adeniyi Babalola (April 20, 1929 – November 3, 2021) was a Nigerian Baptist pastor who lived and served in Nigeria, Ghana, Canada, and the United States. Born in Oke-Ila Orangun, Nigeria, he graduated from his initial pastoral training in December 1949 from the three-year theology course (Certificate of Theology) of the Nigerian Baptist Theological Seminary, Ogbomosho. He is reputed to be one of the two youngest Nigerian nationals (if not the youngest person) ever recruited into the ministry by American (Southern Baptist Convention) missionaries, during a late-1940s drive led by Seminary President Dr. J.C. Pool, assisted by indigenous pastors. Babalola was consecrated as a Baptist trained pastor at the age of 20.

== Parentage and early education ==
Rev. Dr. S. Ade Babalola was the son of Emmanuel Babalola Adekeye and Marian Tinuoye Babalola-Adekeye. As the Obaala of Oke-Ila Orangun, Osun State, Nigeria until his death, his father Babalola Adekeye reigned as the Head of the Arefa (the kingdom's most senior High-Chiefs of king-maker cadre) and he was co-founder of the First Baptist Church of Oke-Ila.

Adeniyi Babalola started school in Oke-Ila but to complete Primary education to Standard 6, he had to travel the 12 miles (almost 20 km) to resume each school term in Iresi across hills and bridgeless rivers. On one of his trips, he came close to drowning while wading across a flooded river but was rescued by a farmer who was providentially nearby. He was recruited to the seminary from his Iresi school after his call to ministry.

== Marriage and Departure to Foreign Missions ==
Rev. Dr. Babalola was married on Dec 16, 1952, to Victoria Titiloye Alao, a daughter of Prince Isaac Adewale Alao of Ara, the founder of her hometown's First Baptist Church. Babalola and his new wife departed Nigeria by sea one week after their wedding, to commence a missionary assignment in Ghana (then the British Gold Coast colony), for which Babalola had earlier volunteered.

== Family ==
At the time of his death aged 92 years, Babalola and his wife had five children (three sons and two daughters), sixteen grandchildren, and 11 great-grandchildren.

== Career ==
On graduation in 1949 with a Certificate in Theology from the Nigerian Baptist Theological Seminary, Babalola was appointed pastor of the First Baptist Churches of two adjoining Nigerian towns, Masifa and Ishoko. During his pastorate in these two churches in the Zion Baptist Association, Babalola met his future wife during activities of the association. Victoria Titiloye Alao was the leader of various Women's organizations in her churches - growing up in Ara and teaching in Olla, and she was Young People's Leader for the Zion Baptist Association.

Babalola pastored the Dunkwa Baptist Church, now the First Baptist Church, Dunkwa-on-Offin and was also a Travelling Pastor across the region. Mrs. Babalola used her vast experience of her youthful activities within the Nigerian Women's Missionary Union to organize similar programs across the assigned missionary territory. On departure from Ghana in 1955, the Babalola family had increased by their first two sons.

On return to Nigeria, Babalola was assigned as Travelling Pastor of the Niger Division which included the Nupe-speaking and Bwari-speaking territories of Nigeria. He was also pastor of the First Baptist Church, Bida, while Mrs. Babalola was appointed to serve as Headmistress to revive the long-dormant Baptist Day School.

At the end of this assignment, Pastor Babalola was awarded a scholarship from the American Baptist Mission Nigeria to attend Oyo Baptist Boys High School at Olivet Heights (later renamed Olivet Baptist High School) where in 1961 he passed the West African School Certificate Examinations that would enable him to qualify for admission to a bachelor's degree program. While at Olivet Heights, Oyo, Babalola pastored the Baptist Church at the Fashola Farm Settlement and later Emmanuel Baptist Church, Oyo. Upon completing his education at Olivet Heights, he briefly pastored Oke-Ado Baptist Church, Ibadan (January to August 1962), from where he was admitted for the seminary Bachelor's degree program at the Nigerian Baptist Theological Seminary, Ogbomoso, Nigeria. Pastor Babalola returned to the seminary for another three years and earned the Bachelor of Theology degree in 1965. He pastored Laka Baptist Church from 1962 to 1965 while a B.Th. student at the seminary.

While with her husband in Ogbomosho, Mrs. Babalola trained at the seminary for the three-year Certificate in Religious Education (CRE) in 1965 and she won the Top Student Award in her combined class of C.Th. and C.R.E. students. (At the time of her graduation from seminary, the Nigerian Baptist Convention had not begun recognizing women as pastors (see Ordination of women) or ordained ministers, but by the late 1990s, Mrs. Babalola was designated as Rev. Mrs. Victoria Titiloye Babalola, although she was actually consecrated into ministry at her graduation in 1965).

=== Later Nigerian Ministry Overview ===
Rev. Dr. S. Ade Babalola served as pastor of the Oke-Ado Baptist Church in Ibadan for 17 years, which is one of the leading churches in the Nigerian Baptist Convention. During this period, Rev. Mrs. V.T. Babalola worked as a Field Worker of the Nigerian Women's Missionary Union and ministered across the rural towns and villages of the Yoruba states of southern Nigeria. She worked in the far northwestern part of Yorubaland (the old Oyo empire) and the riverine southeastern part of Yorubaland. Mrs. Babalola rose to become a Director in the Nigerian Women's Missionary Union. She took early retirement in 1987 to travel to the United States to assist her first son's family in the care of her first four grandsons.

=== Nigerian Ministry Leadership ===
At the Baptist Association level, Babalola served at various times as Financial Secretary, then as the Moderator of Ibadan Baptist Association, served as Coordinator & Moderator of Dunkwa Baptist Association, Ghana, and served as Adviser to the Ibadan and Paku-Awaye Baptist Associations. He also served as Adviser to the Baptist Men's Missionary Union, Bowen Baptist Association, and served as Chairman, Baptist Churches Union of Fiditi, Nigeria.

At the state conference level, Babalola served as the pioneer Secretary, Western Baptist Conference (later constituted into 3 Conferences and now consisting of 5 state conferences), during which he founded and was Editor of "ALORE", the magazine of the Western Baptist Conference, served as Vice-President, Oyo West Baptist Conference, and served as Chairman, Oyo West Conference Baptist People's Fellowship.

At the national level of the Nigerian Baptist Convention, Babalola served at various times as a member of the Executive Committee, the Sunday School Board, the Dental Board, the Medical Advisory Committee, the Nominating Committee, the Church Growth Committee among others.

Inter-denominationally and ecumenically, Babalola served at various times in positions such as Chairman of the Christian Association of Nigeria, Fiditi Zone, Oyo State; Member of the Christian Council of Nigeria, (Western Region); and Member of the National Steering Committee. He was a Life Member of the Bible Society of Nigeria and The International Bible Society.

Babalola was an invited participant and attended (with Rev. Dr. J.T. Ayorinde, General Secretary of the Nigerian Baptist Convention), the First International Congress on World Evangelization, an international invitation-only gathering of “leaders of evangelical Protestant Christians” July 16–25, 1974 for strategic planning, inspiration, and fellowship. Babalola was also a participant at the Nigerian Congress on Evangelization that was held at the University of Ife in August 1975.

=== North American ministry ===
Prior to sojourns in North America, Babalola had twice travelled outside Nigeria, the first time was soon after he started his pastoral career, when he travelled to Ghana as a missionary pastor from December 1952 to December 1955. The second was when he was a sponsored candidate to Switzerland (one of only two Nigerian Baptist pastors) attending ICOWE in July 1974, the First International Congress on World Evangelization which was held in Lausanne.

Babalola left Nigeria twice for North America for his graduate theological education. He attended Acadia University in Wolfville, Nova Scotia (Canada) and earned his Master of Divinity (with an additional bachelor's degree) in 1984.

He attended the Columbia Biblical Seminary & Graduate School of Missions, of Columbia International University, in Columbia, South Carolina (United States), and earned his Doctor of Ministry in 1995. Prior to this, he took training as a Mental Health Specialist which qualified him to work in that capacity for the State of South Carolina, and enabled him to pay his way for his Doctor of Ministries studies.

In the various sojourns in Canada and the United States (for academic pursuits or visits to his children) between 1981 and 2002, Rev. Dr. Babalola also ministered among immigrant African communities (with prayers & confidential family/youth counseling) in Wolfville (Canada), Columbia (South Carolina), Buffalo, (New York) & Houston (Texas). In Houston, they joined to teach in the Yoruba Language School established by the socio-cultural organization, Yoruba Omo Oduduwa, and donated more than two dozen books to the organization.

=== Return to Ogbomosho ===
On his return to Nigeria, Babalola was appointed (after formal age-mandatory retirement from pastorate of the Nigerian Baptist Convention) by his 'alma mater', the Nigerian Baptist Theological Seminary, Ogbomosho, as Director of Academic Affairs, (also termed in other jurisdictions variously as Provost, Dean, Deputy Vice-Chancellor or Pro Vice-Chancellor for Academic Affairs). As Director of Academic Affairs, he led the process for starting a series of new postgraduate programs at Master and Doctorate levels, and as professor, taught a number of graduate and undergraduate courses.

== Retirement ==
In December 2002, Rev. and Mrs. Babalola fully retired from official and unofficial pastoral/academic activities to Oke-Ila Orangun, capital of Ifedayo Local Government, in Osun State. At Oke-Ila, they continued to provide free counseling services as they attended the two Baptist churches, and provided general community leadership. More formally, Babalola served (since his election at the beginning of the 21st century) for almost ten years as President and Chairman of the Board of Oke-Ila Orangun Parapo, his home-town's umbrella association for community development. The election of a formal Executive separate from the Board in December 2009, finally gave some respite and allowed Rev. Dr. S. Ade Babalola and Rev. Mrs. V.T. Babalola to resume their travels to visit their children, grandchildren and great-grandchildren. Babalola was also a member of the Board of Directors of Egbe Omo Ibile Igbomina a community development association of the Igbomina sub-ethnic group of the Yoruba.

== Transition ==
Rev. Dr. Solomon Adeniyi Babalola, died on November 3, 2021, enjoying the care of his 5 biological children, his 5 children-in-law and his 16 grandchildren, in addition to the awe and admiration of his 11 great-grandchildren to which a 12th was born shortly after his death. Rev. Dr. Babalola was preceded in death by Mama Rev. Mrs. V.T. Babalola who died on January 28, 2016.

Rev. Dr. Babalola and Rev. Mrs. Babalola both died in the United States but as they requested, they were both buried in Oke-Ila, Nigeria, side by side in a mausoleum adjoining their home.
