= Lewis Lew =

Singaporean Anglican priest and Vicar of St Andrew's Cathedral, Singapore

The Reverend Canon Lewis Lew
- Vicar of St Andrew's Cathedral, Singapore
- Diocese: Diocese of Singapore
- In office: 2021 – present
- Previous posts: Dean of Nepal (2011 – 2020), Parish Priest (2006 – 2011)

Orders
- Ordination: 2006 (priest)

Personal details
- Born: Singapore
- Denomination: Anglican
- Occupation: Vicar
- Education: Columbia International University

Lewis Lew Boon Chong is a Singaporean Anglican priest and senior clergyman in the Anglican Diocese of Singapore, Church of the Province of South East Asia. He is known for being the Vicar of St Andrew's Cathedral, Singapore, the mother church of the Anglican Diocese of Singapore.

== Education ==
Lew graduated with a Doctor of Philosophy in Organisational Leadership from Columbia International University.

== Priesthood ==
Lew has served as a clergyman since 2006 and held many appointments in the Anglican Diocese of Singapore. From 2011 to 2020, he was formerly the Dean of the Anglican Church in Nepal and was present during the April 2015 Nepal earthquake. During that period, he also served as the Associate Director of Missions. In 2021, he was installed as a canon, at the same service, he was also instituted and inducted as Vicar of St Andrew's Cathedral, Singapore. In his position as Vicar of St Andrew's Cathedral, he is also the Vicar of Westside Anglican Church, an extension centre of St Andrew's Cathedral, and Vicar of St George’s Church.
