= P. T. Chandapilla =

Indian priest (1926–2010)

Very Rev. Podimannil Thomas Chandapilla
- Born: 18 March 1926; India
- Died: 4 December 2010 (aged 84); Thiruvalla
- Occupation: Christian leader
- Church: St. Thomas Evangelical Church of India

Podimannil Thomas Chandapilla (18 March 1926 – 4 December 2010) was the Vicar General of St. Thomas Evangelical Church of India. He ministered to the university students in India and the Church at large through new mission initiatives, including the founding of Jubilee Memorial Bible college at Chennai, India.

== Early life ==
Podimannil Thomas Chandapilla was the only son of a Christian preacher Chiramannil Chandaplilla Thomas and his wife Sosamma Thomas. His parents were members of the Mar Thoma Church, working in tribal areas with no regular income, trusting to God to supply their needs. Despite the family's poverty, Chandapilla was educated in Mar Thoma Boarding school and Gurukulam High School, finishing his schooling in 1942.

== Training ==
He started training as a male nurse/pharmacist at an American Presbyterian Mission Hospital about 800 miles from home, where a Presbyterian pastor inspired him and led him to commit his life to Jesus Christ as Saviour, the start of his personal Christian life. He trained for four years, then after working a year in a mission hospital he went to work as a pharmaceutical nurse in Saudi Arabia. He planned to earn enough to enable him to attend Bible College in India. However, a group of Christians in an American Oil Company in Saudi Arabia funded him to attend Columbia Bible College (now called Columbia International University), South Carolina, USA in 1951.

He graduated in 1955, but renounced the chance to continue his studies because he sensed God was calling him to ministry in India. He travelled back to Mumbai in August 1955, and the following year he married Dorothy, a committed Christian, pharmacist and alumna of Calvary Bible School, Allahabad.

== Ministry ==
Chandapilla and Dorothy started work with the new Union of Evangelical Students of India (UESI). He spent twenty years working among students and became the first General Secretary of the Union of Evangelical Students of India (UESI)--International Fellowship of Evangelical Students/Inter Varsity Christian Fellowship in India, a post he held from 1956 to 1971, ministering to university students, with the aim of reaching India's intellectuals with the Christian gospel.

He became the First Vicar General of St. Thomas Evangelical Church of India (STECI) and also acted as President of the Board of Management of Jubilee Memorial Bible College (JMBC) in Chennai. He also served as General Secretary of the Foundation of Evangelical Churches of India. Columbia International University granted him Distinguished Alumnus status in 1988.

An eloquent preacher, he was described in 1997 with the words, "He lives like Mother Teresa but thinks like John Calvin."

== Partial bibliography ==
- P. T. Chandapilla; Union of Evangelical Students of India (1972). A grain of wheat: the life of I. Joseph Abhisheka Rao. Union of Evangelical Students of India.
- P. T. Chandapilla (1972). My mother! my teacher!: (tributes of a son to a godly mother). Gospel Literature Service.
- P. T. Chandapilla; Asia Theological Association (1977). Local churches and evangelism. Asia Theological Association. ISBN 0-85821-105-X.
- P. T. Chandapilla (1978). Christian leaders and leadership. Gospel Literature Service.
- P. T. Chandapilla (1 July 1985). 예수님의 제자훈련. Hanʼguk Kidok Haksaenghoe Chʻulpʻanbu. ISBN 978-89-328-2001-9.
- P. T. Chandapilla; South Asia Institute of Advanced Christian Studies (1988). Missiological issues in New Testament times. SAIACS.
- P. T. Chandapilla (1998). The Master-trainer. OM Books. ISBN 978-81-7362-131-4.
- P. T. Chandapilla (2004). India's McNally 'Tai': a biography. OM Books. ISBN 978-81-7362-515-2.
- SERVANT by Rt Rev. P.T.Chandapilla. Pune: Select Book Publishers and Distributors, 1990.
