= Kamal Jabbour =

Senior Scientist, US Air Force (born 1957)

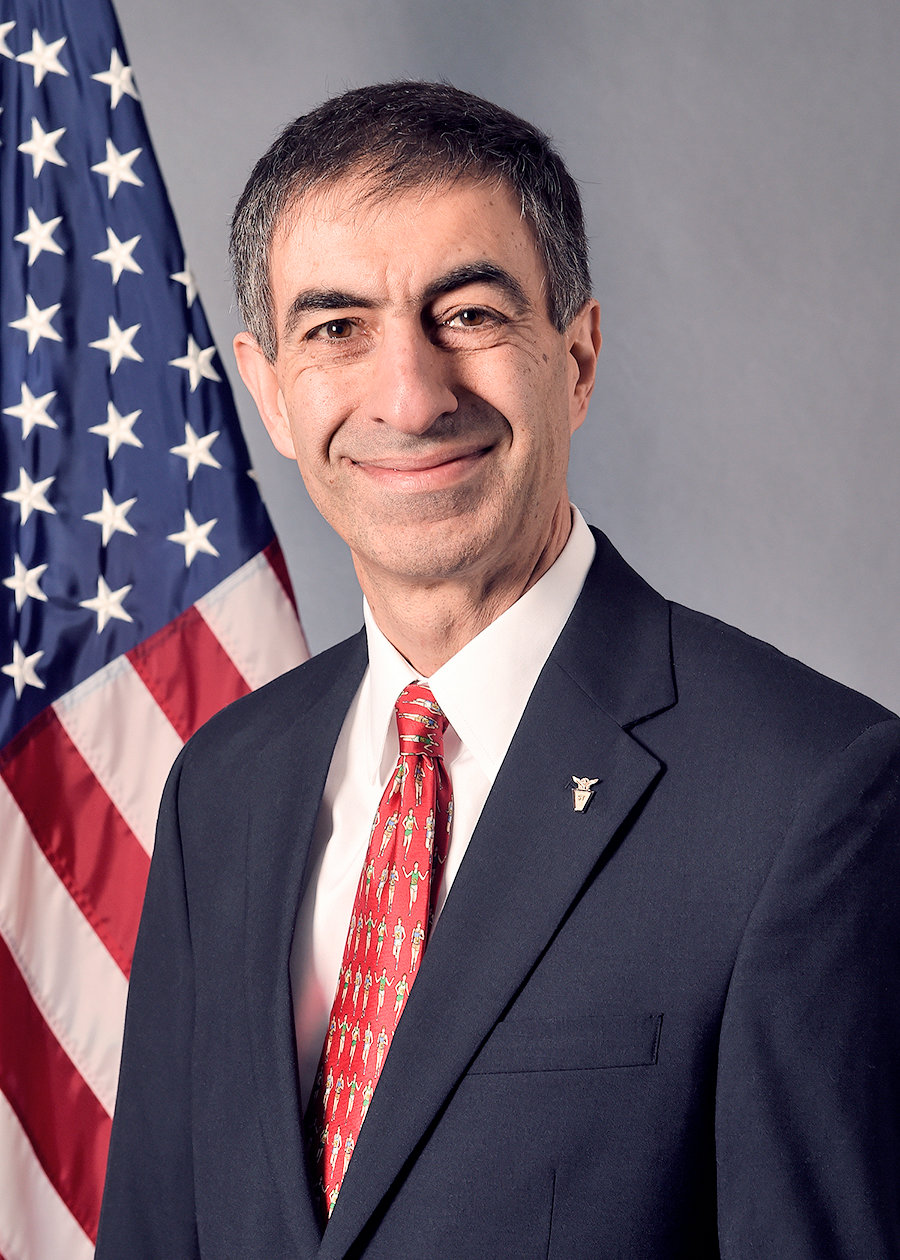
- Born: July 27, 1957 (age 69); Shemlan, Lebanon
- Citizenship: United States of America
- Education: American University of Beirut (BS); University of Salford (PhD)
- Spouses: Gisèle A. Hattab (m. 1979, div. 1994) Dr. Marla A. Bennett (m. 1994)
- Children: 3
- Awards: Teaching Excellence Award, General Electric Corporation; Track and Field Service Award, Syracuse University; Outstanding Service Award, Syracuse Chargers Track Club; Robert Rodale Golden Shoe Award, Runner's World; Harry S. Davis Memorial Award for Outstanding Technical Achievement, Air Force Research Laboratory Information Directorate; United States Air Force Outstanding Information Operations Team of the Year Award; United States Air Force Reserve Command Information Dominance General Edwin W. Rawlings Team Award (2); Federal 100, Federal Government Information Technology Leaders with Greatest Impact; United States Air Force Outstanding Civilian Career Service Award.
- Scientific career
- Thesis: The Measurement and Equalization of Group Delay Distortion at Audio Frequencies (1982)
- Doctoral advisor: Dr. B.H. Pardoe

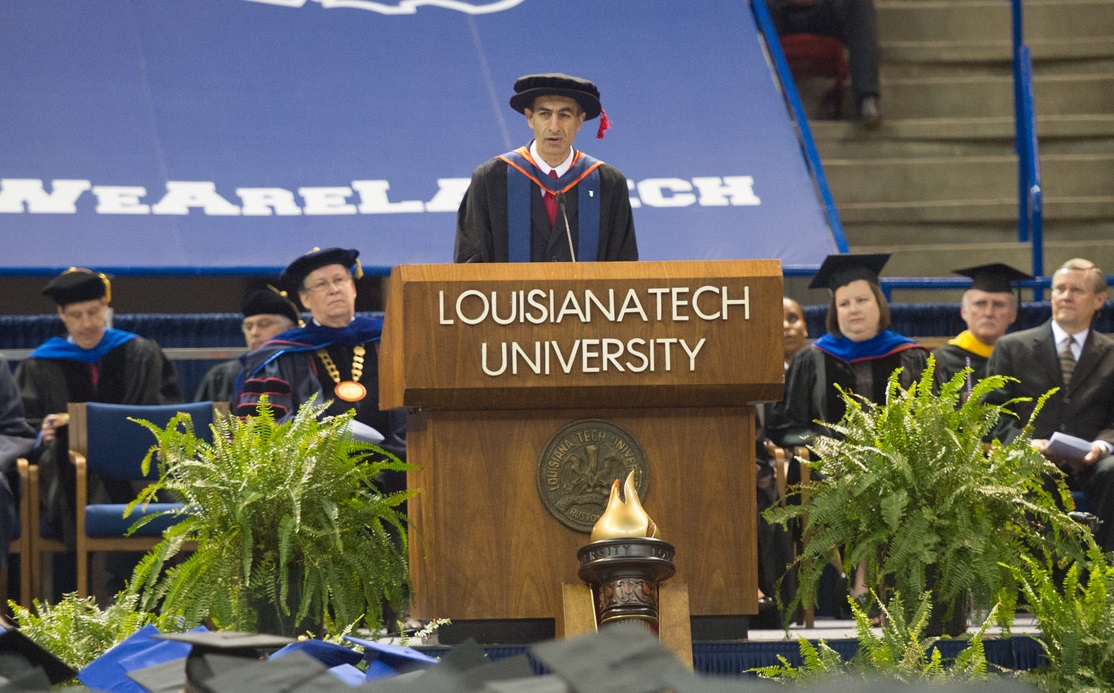
Jabbour gives 2015 Commencement Address at Louisiana Tech University

Kamal Toufic Jabbour (born July 27, 1957) is a retired member of the Scientific and Professional Career Service of the United States of America SES having served for 15 years as the United States Air Force Senior Scientist for Information Assurance. He is also the Founding Director of the Advanced Course in Engineering Cyber Security Boot Camp for ROTC cadets, developer of the Bachelor of Science in Cyber Engineering, and designer of the trademarked Cyber Blue Book for cyber vulnerability assessment of Air Force missions and weapons.

Jabbour served on the Electrical and Computer Engineering faculty at Syracuse University for 20 years, including three years as department chairman, before joining the information warfare branch at the Air Force Research Laboratory Information Directorate. Jabbour was named to the Federal 100 for his outstanding contributions to federal information technology. He retired from the United States Air Force in 2022.

== Personal life ==
Kamal Toufic Jabbour was born on July 27, 1957 into a Maronite Christian family in the village of Shemlan, the birthplace of the late historian Philip K. Hitti, 25 km southeast of Beirut, in Mount Lebanon, Lebanon. Jabbour attended high school at the Collège Mont La Salle in Ain Saadeh where he won three national championships in chess between 1972 and 1975. Winning the Edgar Tcheleby Memorial chess tournament in 1974 against an international field marked the pinnacle of his chess career. He also earned a brown belt in Shotokan Karate. Following high school, he studied electrical engineering at the American University of Beirut and graduated with distinction in 1979. He pursued post-graduate studies in digital communications at the University of Salford in the United Kingdom and earned a PhD in 1982. He immigrated to the United States of America in 1982 and became a naturalized US citizen in 1989.

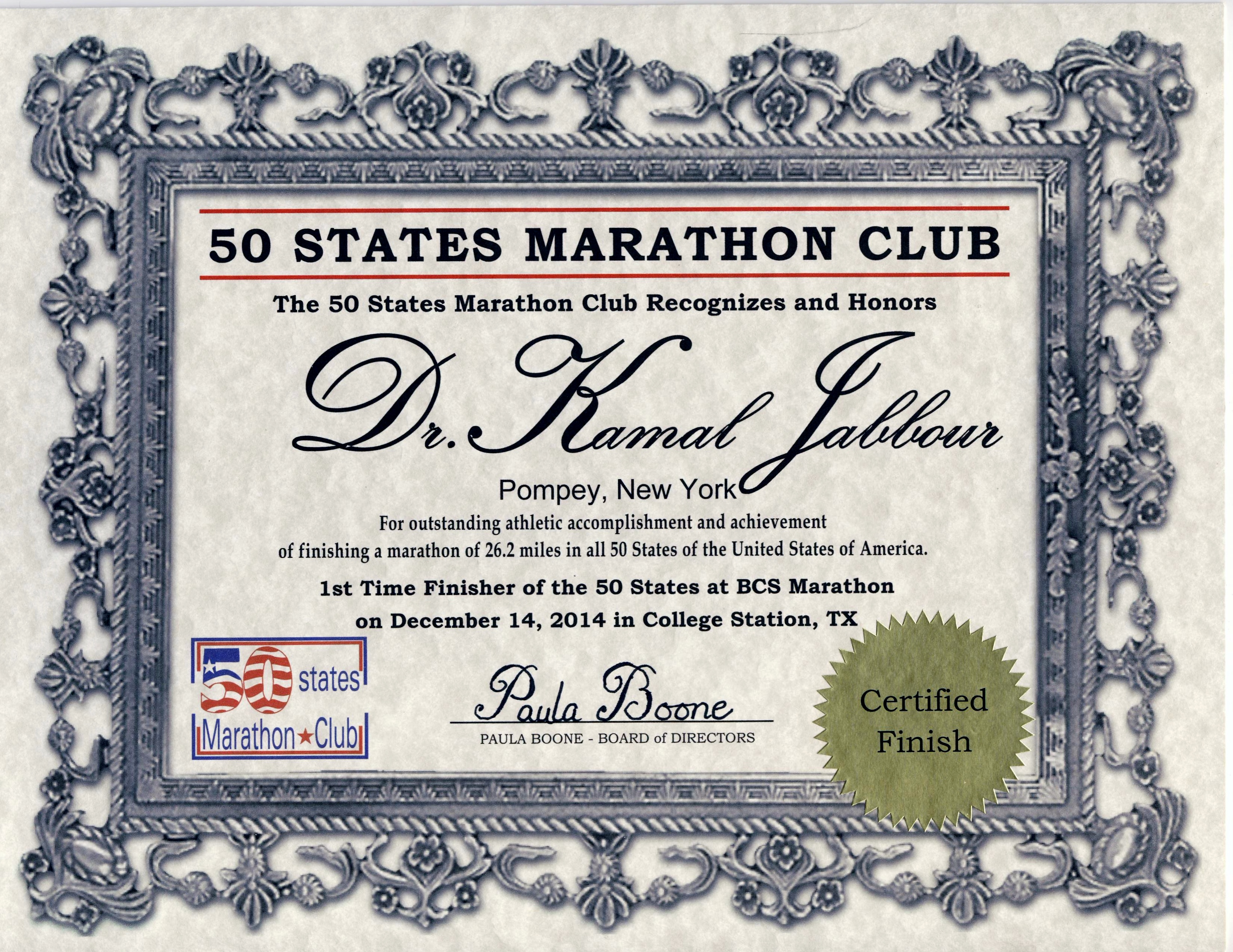
50 States Marathon Club Certificate of Completion

He is an avid distance runner who has completed marathons in all 50 States with a personal record of 3:51:49 in the 1997 Marine Corps Marathon. He is a member of the 50 States Marathon Club and the Marathon Maniacs.

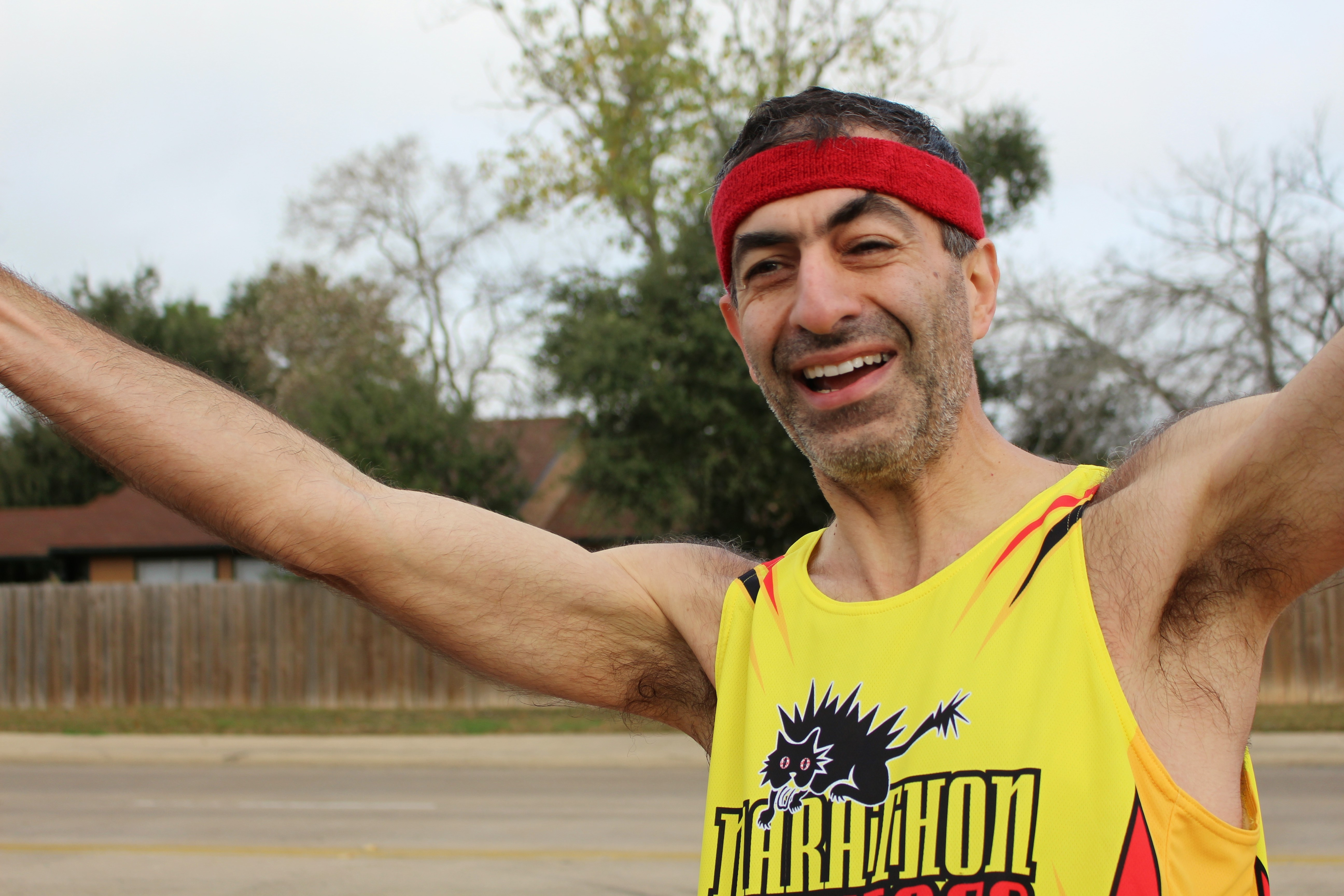

From 1997 to 2003, he wrote a weekly article on running for The Post-Standard. In 1997, Jabbour and his wife Marla helped to establish The Stabler Running Collection at Syracuse University by donating over 500 books that tell the stories of runners and races.

Jabbour is an ordained elder in Presbyterian Church (USA) and a trustee at Fabius Christian Church, and he covers the pulpit in pastors' absences. He has preached on light, the prophet Elijah, happiness and joy, gratitude not guilt, good and evil, his testimony, the star of Bethlehem, a republic if you can keep it, and singing a new song. Jabbour contributed to a documentary video on the life and legacy of Private Emmett O. Preston, (1896-1918), Headquarters Company 23rd Infantry AEF.

== Academic career ==
Jabbour joined the electrical and computer engineering faculty at Syracuse University as an assistant professor in 1982, and earned tenure and promotion in 1989. He served as chairman of the department of electrical and computer engineering at Syracuse University from 1990 to 1993. In 1999, he created TrackMeets.com to broadcast track meets through the Internet in TV quality video. In 2001, Jabbour co-founded Syracuse University's Center for Systems Assurance which received National Security Agency designation as a Center of Excellence in Information Assurance.

Jabbour studied the adverse effects of group delay distortion on the performance of computer networks during his post-graduate research, and carried this interest into his post-doctoral work.

Jabbour's early research at Syracuse University was funded by International Business Machines to assess the Fiber Distributed Data Interface (FDDI) for use in the International Space Station and focused on the use of FDDI as a backbone to interconnect heterogeneous networks. His research expanded across the network stack to include routing and performance issues, and he leveraged formal methods to verify the correctness of the upper layers of network protocols.

Jabbour researched using Artificial Intelligence (AI) to study the impact of weather on electric power systems with funding from Niagara Mohawk Power Corporation. He developed an Automated Load Forecasting Assistant (ALFA) and a Gas Automated Load Forecaster (GAuLF), explored load flow analysis on parallel computers, and invented a patented approach for alarms processing.

== Air Force career ==
Jabbour joined the Air Force Research Laboratory under the Intergovernmental Personnel Act in 1998, and transitioned into civil service in 2004. He developed the Advanced Course in Engineering Cyber Security Boot Camp in 2003 and created the world's first high school cyber security program at Rome Catholic School in 2006. Raphael Mudge, the developer of the Armitage (computing) tool, credits the ACE problem-solving method for his career in cyber security.

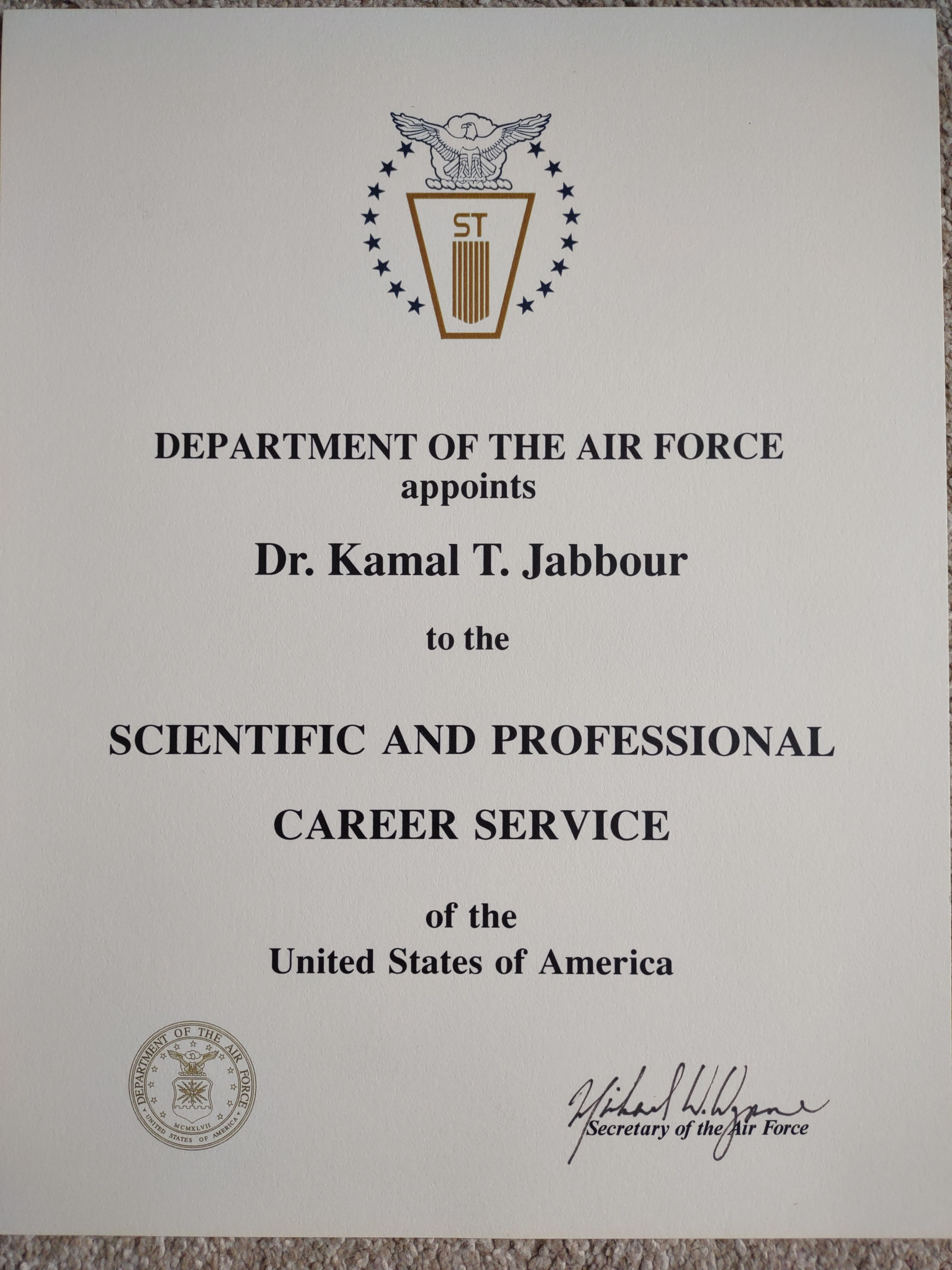
Certificate of Appointment to the Scientific and Professional Career Service

Following his appointment as United States Air Force Senior Scientist for Information Assurance in 2007, Jabbour published a booklet to educate airmen on the cyberspace domain, followed by a journal paper on the science and technology of cyber operations.

He served on three studies of the United States Air Force Scientific Advisory Board: Implications of Cyber Warfare, Defending and Operating in a Contested Cyber Environment, and Cyber Vulnerabilities of Embedded Systems on Air and Space Systems. Jabbour acted as lead for the Air component of Cyber Vision 2025 United States Air Force Cyberspace Science and Technology Vision 2012-2025, exploring the role of cyberspace in the air mission of the United States Air Force.

In 2010, Jabbour created a curriculum outline for a bachelor of science degree in cyber engineering, and called on universities to implement it, likening the time to that of the creation of astronautics engineering at the dawn of the space age half a century earlier. Louisiana Tech University answered the call and implemented the first cyber engineering curriculum. In 2015, Jabbour gave the commencement address at Louisiana Tech, awarding the diploma to the nation's first cyber engineering graduate.

In 2011, the commandant of the U.S. Air Force Test Pilot School asked Jabbour to create a cyber course to educate test pilots on the dependence of modern aircraft on cyber and the resulting mission risks of cyber vulnerabilities. Jabbour taught the resulting Cyber Systems Test Course from 2012 to 2019. Jabbour examined the risks of cyber fratricide, or friendly cyber fire, and its unforeseen consequences, and the role of deterrence in cyber warfare.

In a seminal paper on the science of mission assurance in the Journal of Strategic Security, Jabbour introduced the information lifecycle as the foundation for mission assurance against cyber risk, and presented 12 rules that govern cyber vulnerability assessment of systems and missions. Jabbour codified the information lifecycle approach to cyber vulnerability assessment in the Cyber Blue Book methodology that enabled the Air Force Operational Test and Evaluation Center to assess over 100 weapon systems. Jabbour educated United States Air Force engineers on conducting systematic cyber vulnerability assessments that informed the testers in designing repeatable operational tests on these systems. This approach, and the teams that implemented it, increased the readiness of weapons and earned Air Force-level honors and awards.

Jabbour looked beyond the current global information grid, and outlined a vision for next-generation military networks. He sought to move the posture of critical missions from resilience to robustness, and proposed anti-fragility as a desired objective.

Jabbour advocated mission assurance through correct design by mathematical specification of requirements and formal verification of implementations. He received a US patent for a method for manufacturing and executing single-use systems with proven security properties over the life of a mission.

== Astronomy ==
In 2024, Jabbour received a two-year appointment as visiting scholar at the Physics and Astronomy Department at the State University of New York at Oswego, where he operated the observatory at the Rice Creek Field Station and assisted in astronomy research, instruction and public outreach activities. Jabbour contributed data to the Hunting Outbursting Young Stars (HOYS) citizen science project at the University of Kent in the UK, and served as a DWARFLAB Ambassador, assisting in beta testing of astronomy hardware and software.
