= Nabeel Jabbour =

American academic

Nabeel T. Jabbour
- Born: 1941 (age 84–85)
- Education: American University of Beirut; Near East School of Theology; University of South Africa
- Occupations: Professor; Author; Lecturer
- Known for: Expertise in Muslim culture
- Website: http://www.nabeeljabbour.com

Nabeel T. Jabbour (born 1941) is a Syrian-born author, lecturer, and expert on Muslim culture. Jabbour's background includes two perspectives—that of the Arab/Muslim world and of the Western/Christian world. He frequently speaks at churches and teaches at seminaries, interpreting the phenomenon of Islamic fundamentalism and other Middle Eastern issues to Westerners and especially to Christians.

== Early life ==
Jabbour was born in Syria and raised in Lebanon.

== Academic career ==
Jabbour taught high school for two years in Tripoli, Lebanon, then taught psychology and cultural studies (history of civilizations) for two years at Haigazian University in Beirut. From 1973 to 1975, he worked with university students in Beirut with The Navigators, a Christian parachurch organization. From 1975 to 1990, he lived and worked in Cairo, Egypt.

Jabbour teaches courses on "Islam and Current Events" and "Radical Islam and a Christian Response" at:

- Columbia International University – Columbia, South Carolina
- Denver Seminary – Denver, Colorado
- Fuller Theological Seminary – Colorado Springs, Colorado
- Providence College and Theological Seminary – Winnipeg, Manitoba, Canada
- Graduate Institute of Applied Linguistics & College of International Studies – Dallas, Texas

In 2011, the Presbyterian Church in America appointed Jabbour to a study committee on the theology and practices of insider movements.

Jabbour also participated in the Windows to the World Conference in Milwaukee, Wisconsin and Chicago, Illinois in April 2015 and the Association of Christian Design Professionals conference in Colorado Springs, Colorado on November 15, 2014.

Jabbour serves on the board of directors for Touch of Love International, a nonprofit organization that offers micro-loans and vocational training to impoverished families in developing countries.

== Published works ==
Books:

- The Crescent Through the Eyes of the Cross (NavPress, 2008)
- Unshackled and Growing: Muslims and Christians on the Journey to Freedom (NavPress, 2006)
- The Unseen Reality (NavMedia of Singapore, 1995)
- The Rumbling Volcano: Islamic Fundamentalism in Egypt (Mandate Press, 1993)
- Itiba' el-Massih, Hal Huwa Ta'geez? (Dar el-Thaqafa of Egypt)
- Al-Kiraza Hubon Wa 'ubour (Dar el-Thaqafa of Egypt)

On February 15, 2008, the date of its release, The Crescent Through the Eyes of the Cross ranked 31st on Amazon.com's Bestsellers list. On the same day, it ranked first in the "Religion and Spirituality/Christianity" and Religion and Spirituality/Islam" categories. In England, it ranked first in Amazon.com's "Middle Eastern Studies" category.

Articles and essays:

- But Can We Trust Mustafa?, Mission Frontiers September–October 2008, 18-19
- Relational Evangelism Among Muslims: Is There a Better Way?, International Journal of Frontier Missions 25:3 (Fall 2008), 151-156
- Islamic Fundamentalism: Implications for Missions, International Journal of Frontier Missions 11:2 (April 1994), 81–86, St. Francis Magazine, Nr. 1 Vol. II (June 2006)
- Islamic Fundamentalism: An Arab Evangelical Offers a Surprising Perspective, The Plain Truth, July–August 1999
- The Unseen Reality: A Panoramic View of Spiritual Warfare, NavPress of Singapore, 1995

Audio recordings:

- 10 Reasons Muslims are Eager to Join ISIS, Zwemer Center for Muslim Studies (2016)
- "How ISIS Began in Colorado," podcast on Truth About Muslims/Muslims Christians and the Zombie Apocalypse by Zwemer Center for Muslim Studies, released January 7, 2015
- Understanding Islam (2007)
- The Many Faces of Islam: Library Edition (2004)
- The Many Faces of Islam (America Responds) (2002)

== Bibliography ==
- 12 Must-Reads on Mission and Islam by Fuller Professors, Global Reflections Blog, Fuller Theological Seminary, February 23, 2016
- Does Media Mix Islam and Politics?, The Huffington Post, Preetam Kaushik, August 7, 2013
- Interview with David Garrison, "In the House of Islam" DVD, WorldChristian.com, 2014
- Ayman S. Ibrahim, book review in Baptist Theology, Southwestern Baptist Theological Seminary
- Jerrid Stelter, book review on Sixteen:Fifteen
- "101 Books on Missions", BAMEDU.com
- Thomas Freeman, "Insider's View of Muslim Worldview Evangelism", tfreeman.org, August 21, 2013
- Thomas Turner, book review in Everyday Liturgy, January 27, 2011
- Warren Larson, "My Top 5 Books on Islam," Christianity Today, September 2009 "Warren Larson's Top 5 Books on Islam". September 3, 2009.
- Colin Chapman, "Premillennial Theology, Christian Zionism, and Christian Mission," International Bulletin of Missionary Research, 33:3 (July 2009), 137
- Sam Townsend, "The Thirsty Rock of the Middle East," Prodigal, January 27, 2009
- Paul Ramseyer, interview for Sounds of Hope 2008 on Vimeo, October 15, 2008 "Sounds of Hope 2008 (Nabeel Jabbour)".
- Pastor Bob Paulson, interview on BlogTalkRadio, November 12, 2008
- Ted Elm, interview on Northland Notebook with Ted Elm, WWJC, October 7, 2008
- Mark Elfstrand, interview on The Morning Show with Mark Elfstrand, WMBI-FM/Moody Broadcasting Network, August 4, 2008
- Waldron Scott, published under "Review and Preview," Global Missiology, 3:5 (April 2008) "Vol 3, No 5 (2008)".
- Janet Parshall, interview on Talking it Over, Moody Broadcasting Network, April 5, 2008
- Janet Parshall, interview on Janet Parshall's America, March 4, 2008
- Lorri Allen and Larry Estepa, interview on Mornings, FamilyNet Radio, April 7, 2008
- Neil Stavem, interview on The Way Home, Northwestern Radio Network, April 3, 2008
- Debbie Chavez, interview on The Debbie Chavez Show, May 23, 2008
- "Recommended Books" review, Friends and Neighbors, Reformed Church in America, 2008
- "Recommended Resources," One-to-One Ministry Review, The Navigators, February 20, 2008
- Speaker biography, Faces of Islam Symposium, Northwest University, September 25, 2007
- Ralph D. Winter, book review in International Journal of Frontier Missions, William Carey University, 23:2 (April–June 2006), 86
- "Learning to Love Muslims," One-to-One Ministry Review, The Navigators, October 12, 2006
- Rich Wilton, "International Insights from Nabeel Jabbour," The Navigators of Canada, November 11, 2005
- Seminar description, "Reaching Muslim Students on Campus," Urbana (convention), 2003
- Jeremy Craig, article in redandblack.com (University of Georgia), August 29, 2002
- AudioFile (magazine), audio lecture review, August/September 2002
- Bibliography, The Moral Economy of Islam, Institute of International Studies, University of California, Berkeley, 1998
- Author biography, Oasis Audio
- GodTube video chat with Ed Hoskins, April 3, 2008
- GodTube video introduction to The Crescent through the Eyes of the Cross, February 15, 2008
