= Columbia International University =

Christian university in Columbia, South Carolina

Coordinates: 34°04′33″N 81°04′31″W

- Former names: Columbia Bible School (1923–1929); Columbia Bible College (1929–1994)
- Motto: To know Him and to make Him known.
- Type: Private university
- Established: 1923; 103 years ago
- Religious affiliation: Multidenominational Christian
- Endowment: $11.2 million (2024)
- President: William H. Jones
- Students: 3,360 (Fall 2026)
- Undergraduates: 955(Fall 2025)
- Postgraduates: 2,300 (Fall 2025)
- Location: Columbia, South Carolina, United States
- Campus: Rural, 400 acres (162 ha)
- Colors: Blue & Gold
- Nickname: Rams
- Sporting affiliations: NAIA – Appalachian
- Mascot: Ram
- Website: www.ciu.edu
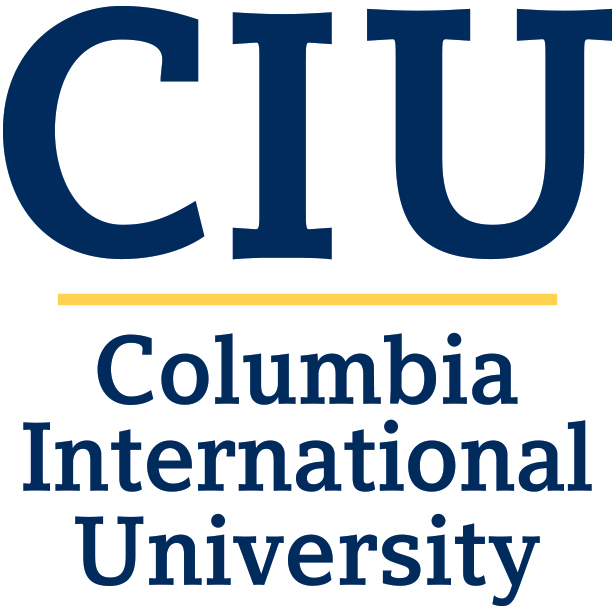

Columbia International University (CIU) is a private Christian university in Columbia, South Carolina, United States. It was founded in 1923.

== History ==
Robert C. McQuilken founded Columbia Bible College and the Ben Lippen School For Boys. He was the author of several books (Victorious Life Studies, Outline and Message of Romans, Studying Our Lord’s Parables, and Can We Trust The Old Testament). He served as the college's first president.

== Academics ==
CIU has six colleges: College of Arts and Sciences, College of Education, Cook School of Business, School of Missions & Intercultural Ministry, School of Nursing, Seminary and School of Counseling.

The university is accredited by the Commission on Colleges of the Southern Association of Colleges and Schools and the Commission on Accreditation of the Association for Biblical Higher Education. The Graduate School is also approved by the South Carolina Department of Education to offer graduate degrees in early childhood and elementary education leading to certification as a teacher in State of South Carolina.

== Student life ==
CIU has doctrinal affirmations and lifestyle standards which all students (regardless of degree sought) are expected to uphold as a part of admission. Some of the standards include prohibition from alcohol and tobacco. Though not required during summer and winter breaks, students are expected to maintain CIU lifestyle standards.

There are seven doctrinal points which students must consent to as a part of their admission to and candidacy for a degree from CIU. These are biblical inspiration, natural separation of humanity from God, salvation by grace through faith in Christ, the historical doctrine of the Trinity, the bodily resurrection of Christ from the dead, the indwelling of the Holy Spirit in the believer, and the evangelical mandate to witness to the gospel of Christ. The doctrine of Premillennialism is officially held by the school, but students are not required to adhere to this doctrine. CIU requires all teaching faculty to affirm Premillennialism.

== Athletics ==
The Columbia International (CIU) athletic teams are called the Rams. The university is a member of the Division I level of the National Association of Intercollegiate Athletics (NAIA), primarily competing in the Appalachian Athletic Conference (AAC) since the 2018–19 academic year. They are also a member of the National Christian College Athletic Association (NCCAA), primarily competing as an independent in the South Region of the Division I level.

CIU currently competes in 13 intercollegiate athletic teams: Men's sports include baseball, basketball, cross country, golf, soccer, and track & field; while women's sports include basketball, cross country, soccer, softball, track & field and volleyball. The university also competes in Esports, which is currently the only coed athletic team at CIU.

== Ben Lippen School ==
The Ben Lippen School is a private, interdenominational Christian school located on the CIU campus. It was founded as a boarding school in Asheville, North Carolina, in the 1940s, but was moved to its current location in 1988, offering middle and high school programs. An elementary school away from the main CIU campus was begun in 1989, and in 2006, a main elementary school campus was completed on CIU grounds and classes began there in August. The schools are co-educational and feature a mix of commuting and resident students. The curriculum teaches subjects from an evangelical Christian worldview and includes Bible classes. Chapel is obligatory for students, faculty, and staff. In 2025, there were nearly 1,200 students enrolled at the school.

== Notable alumni ==
- Solomon Adeniyi Babalola – missionary
- Doris Bartholomew – linguist
- Laura Belle Barnard – missionary
- Chet Bitterman – linguist and missionary
- P. T. Chandapilla – missionary pastor
- Travis Greene – Gospel musician and pastor
- Nabeel Jabbour – researcher on Muslim culture
- Andreas J. Köstenberger – Bible scholar
- Lewis Lew – Anglican priest and vicar of St. Andrew's Cathedral, Singapore
- Chad Prather – internet personality
- Joy Ridderhof – missionary
- Laura Story – Gospel musician
- Phillip Yancey – spiritual writer
- Paul David Tripp - spiritual writer
- Tullian Tchividjian - pastor, author, and grandson of Billy Graham
