= Julia Jabour =

- Education: Murdoch University (BA) University of Tasmania (PhD)
- Scientific career
- Fields: Antarctic Law and Policy
- Workplaces: University of Tasmania Lowy Institute The Polar Connection

Julia Jabour is an Antarctic researcher, writer, and lecturer who worked out of the Institute for Marine and Antarctic Studies (IMAS) at the University of Tasmania, Australia for more than 25 years. She retired from the Institute for Marine and Antarctic Studies in July of 2019. With this background, Jabour has been a member of policy think tanks, the Lowy Institute and The Polar Connection.

== Education ==
Jabour majored in politics, philosophy, and sociology for her BA degree at Murdoch University in Perth, Western Australia. She majored in Antarctic and Southern Ocean Studies while earning her Graduate Diploma with Honors. Jabour earned her PhD at the University of Tasmania and her research focused on the shifting dynamics of control in the Arctic and Antarctic due to growing environmental cooperation.

== Career and impact ==
Julia Jabour has made up to six trips to Antarctica for her various works. In 2021, she worked with the University of Oslo to carryout the Political Philosophy Looks to Antarctica research trip. Her lecturing career has spanned from Australia, Malaysia, Iceland, and New Zealand. Her teachings focus on how developments in science and technology can aid in Antarctic policy work. Jabour's expertise has made her a delegate to the Antarctic Treaty Consultive Meetings three times. She served as an advisor and representative for the Australian government at these meetings. In 2014 she hosted the 7th Polar Law Symposium in Hobart, Australia. Jabour uses her experience in the field to publish many articles on Antarctic policy and events. In 2021, Jabour and fellow scientists spoke out against a proposed airport and runway that would be situated near Davis Station, Antarctica. This project was eventually shelved in 2023 due to pushback in the name of environmental impact.

== Selected works ==
- Jabour, Julia, and Melissa Weber. “Is It Time to Cut the Gordian Knot of Polar Sovereignty?” Review of European Community &amp; International Environmental Law 17, no. 1 (April 2008): 27–40. https://doi.org/10.1111/j.1467-9388.2008.00579.x.
- Jabour, Julia, Hangga Fathana, Shruti Pandalai, and David Saultry. “Building a Paved Runway in Antarctica.” Lowy Institute, May 29, 2026. https://www.lowyinstitute.org/the-interpreter/building-paved-runway-antarctica.
- Jabour, Julia. Explainer: What any country can and can’t do in Antarctica, in the name of Science, October 31, 2018. https://doi.org/10.64628/aa.394j54gqh.
- Jabour, Julia. “Strategic Management and Regulation of Antarctic Tourism.” Antarctic Futures, October 4, 2013, 273–86. https://doi.org/10.1007/978-94-007-6582-5_12.
- Jabour, Julia. “Why Has There Been a ‘Long Peace’ in Antarctica?” The Yearbook of Polar Law Online 7, no. 1 (December 5, 2015): 632–45. https://doi.org/10.1163/2211-6427_024.
