= Jabour (Rio de Janeiro) =

Region of Rio de Janeiro, Brazil

Coordinates: 22°52′51″S 43°29′32″W

Jabour is a region of the city of Rio de Janeiro, named after Lebanese immigrant Abrahão Jabour (b. 1884).
