= Najla Jabor =

Brazilian conductor and composer (1915–2001)

Maia de Carvalho Najla Jabor (25 September 1915 – 9 March 2001) was a Brazilian conductor and composer.

She composed concerti and symphonic works, but is best known for sacred songs. She was born and died in Rio de Janeiro, Brazil.

== Works ==
Selected works include:

- Suite de seis peças, no. 3. Um adeus (Text: Alda Pereira Pinto), no. 5. A um poeta (Text: Alda Pereira Pinto), no. ?. Louco devaneio (Text: Alda Pereira Pinto)
- A palavra de Deus (Text: Stela Dubois)
- A semente é a dor amor (Text: Roque Martins)
- A um poeta (in Suite de seis peças) (Text: Alda Pereira Pinto)
- A um poeta - Loucos devaneios
- Alucinação (Text: José Alfredo Maia de Carvalho)
- Assim falou o poeta
- Ave Maria (Text: Bible or other Sacred Texts)
- Balada n.1: Teus olhos (Text: Beni Carvalho)
- Balada n.2 (Text: Ricardina Marques da Silva)
- Barcarola, op. 92 (Text: Dylma Cunha de Oliveira)
- Batuque n.1 (Text: Silvio Moreaux)
- Batuque n.2 (Text: Raimundo de Brito)
- Berceuse, op. 11
- Canção bárbara (Text: Olga Mayer)
- Canção de amor (Text: Iveta Ribeiro)
- Canção do trovador (Text: José Alfredo Maia de Carvalho)
- Canção dos olhos
- Canção simples (berceuse), op. 83 (Text: Nóbrega de Siqueira)
- Copo de cristal (Text: Agrippino Grieco)
- Desejo, op. 47 (Text: Iveta Ribeiro)
- Gato preto (Text: Nóbrega de Siqueira)
- Louco devaneio (in Suite de seis peças) (Text: Alda Pereira Pinto)
- Noturno com palavras (Text: José Alfredo Maia de Carvalho)
- Noturno n.3 - Rosa menina
- Novo amor, op. 85 (Text: Aracy Rivera de Rezende)
- O sonho (Text: J. Benedito Silveira Peixoto)
- Oração à esperança (Text: Leopoldo Braga)
- Pode entrar saudade (Text: E. Mangione, Jr.)
- Romance, op. 11 (Text: Iveta Ribeiro)
- Romance, op. 13 (Text: Iveta Ribeiro)
- Romance, op. 56 (Text: Iveta Ribeiro)
- Romance, op. 3 (Text: Sergio Murilo)
- Romance, op. 6 (Text: José Jorge Guilherme de Araújo Jorge)
- Sou assim
- Toada n.1: brasileira (Text: Iveta Ribeiro)
- Toada n.2: morena (Text: Carlos Paula Barros)
- Toada n.3: Não sei viver sem ti (Text: Diva Jabor)
- Toada n.5: Quando o amor vem(Text: Antônio Siqueira)
- Toda n.4: Amor (Text: Carlos Paula Barros)
- Um adeus (in Suite de seis peças) (Text: Alda Pereira Pinto)
- Único amor (berceuse), op. 65 (Text: Elora Possolo)
