= Anya Jabour =

American historian

- Education: Rice University (PhD), Oberlin College (BA)
- Awards: Regents Professor, Helen and Winston Cox Award
- Scientific career
- Workplaces: University of Montana
- Thesis: Hearts divided: The marriage and family of Elizabeth and William Wirt, 1802-1834 (1995)
- Doctoral advisor: John B. Boles
- Website: https://www.anyajabour.com/

Anya Jabour is an American historian and Regents Professor of History at the University of Montana. She is known for her works on history of family and U.S. women's history. Jabour received the Helen and Winston Cox Award for Excellence in Teaching in 2000.

== Books ==
- Sophonisba Breckinridge: Championing Women's Activism in Modern America, University of Illinois Press, 2019
- Topsy-Turvy: How the Civil War Turned the World Upside Down for Southern Children, Ivan R. Dee, 2010
- Family Values in the Old South, University Press of Florida, 2010
- Scarlett's Sisters: Young Women in the Old South, University of North Carolina Press, 2007
- Major Problems in the History of American Families and Children, Houghton Mifflin Co., 2005
- Marriage in the Early Republic: Elizabeth and William Wirt and the Companionate Ideal, Johns Hopkins University Press, 1998
