= Pentecostal Maranatha Gospel Church =

Church in Kerala, India

- Classification: Pentecostal
- Region: India
- Headquarters: Palayam, Thiruvananthapuram
- Origin: 9 April 1972; PMG Junction, Thiruvananthapuram, Kerala, India
- Ministers: 200+
- Places of worship: 120+

Pentecostal Maranatha Gospel Church, abbreviated as PMGC was started on Sunday, 9 April 1972 at Pr K.M. George’s (First President) residence near PMG Junction, Thiruvananthapuram, Kerala, India. The first baptism was on 8 April 1972, in which 14 members received water baptism.
